The Lepidoptera of Honduras consist of both the butterflies and moths recorded from Honduras.

According to a recent estimate, there are a total of 861 butterfly and 1,441 moth species present in Honduras.

Note: the abbreviation sp. nr. means "species near".

Butterflies

Papilionoidea

Papilionidae
Battus ingenuus (Dyar, 1907),
Battus laodamas copanae (Reakirt, 1863)
Battus lycidas (Cramer, 1777)
Battus polydamas polydamas (Linnaeus, 1758)
Eurytides agesilaus neosilaus (Höpffer, 1865)
Eurytides calliste calliste (H. Bates, 1864)
Eurytides dioxippus lancandones (H. Bates, 1864)
Eurytides epidaus epidaus (Doubleday, 1846)
Eurytides macrosilaus macrosilaus (Gray, [1853])
Eurytides philolaus philolaus (Boisduval, 1836)
Eurytides salvini (H. Bates, 1864)
Eurytides thyastes marchandii (Boisduval, 1836)
Heraclides anchisiades idaeus (Fabricius, 1793)
Heraclides androgeus epidaurus (Godman & Salvin, 1890)
Heraclides astyalus pallas (G. Gray, [1853])
Heraclides cresphontes (Cramer, 1777)
Heraclides ornythion (Boisduval, 1836)
Heraclides paeon thrason (C. Felder & R. Felder, 1865)
Heraclides thoas autocles (Rothschild & Jordan, 1906)
Heraclides torquatus tolmides (Godman & Salvin, 1890)
Mimoides ilus branchus (Doubleday, 1846)
Mimoides phaon phaon (Boisduval, 1836)
Mimoides thymbraeus thymbraeus (Boisduval, 1836)
Papilio birchallii bryki Strand, 1930
Papilio erostratus erostratus Westwood, 1847
Papilio garamas electryon H. Bates, 1864
Papilio polyxenes asterius (Stoll, 1782)
Papilio victorinus victorinus E. Doubleday, 1844
Papilio vulneratus vulneratus Butler, 1872
Parides childrenae childrenae (Gray, 1832)
Parides erathalion polyzelus (C. Felder & R. Felder, 1865)
Parides eurimedes mylotes (H. Bates, 1861)
Parides iphidamas iphidamas (Fabricius, 1793)
Parides montezuma (Westwood, 1842)
Parides panares lycimenes (Boisduval, 1870)
Parides photinus (Doubleday, 1844)
Parides sesostris zestos (Gray, [1853])

Hesperiidae

Eudaminae
Achalarus albociliatus albociliatus (Mabille, 1877)
Achalarus toxeus (Plötz, 1882)
Aguna asander asander (Hewitson, 1867)
Aguna aurunce hypozonius (Plötz, 1880)
Aguna claxon Evans, 1952
Aguna panama Austin & Mielke, 1998
Astraptes alardus latia Evans, 1952
Astraptes alector hopfferi (Plötz, 1881)
Astraptes anaphus annetta Evans, 1952
Astraptes brevicauda (Plötz, 1886)
Astraptes chiriquensis chiriquensis (Staudinger, 1876)
Astraptes egregius egregius (Butler, 1870)
Astraptes enotrus (Stoll, 1781)
Astraptes "fulgerator azul" (Reakirt, [1867])
Astraptes janeira (Schaus, 1902)
Astraptes phalaecus (Godman & Salvin, 1893)
Astraptes talus (Cramer, 1777)
Astraptes tucuti (R. Williams, 1927)
Astraptes weymeri (Plötz, 1882)
Autochton bipunctatus (Gmelin, 1790)
Autochton longipennis (Plötz, 1882)
Autochton neis (Geyer, 1832)
Autochton vectilucis (Butler, 1872)
Autochton zarex (Hübner, 1818)
Bungalotis astylos (Cramer, 1780)
Bungalotis erythus (Cramer, 1775)
Bungalotis midas (Cramer, 1775)
Bungalotis quadratum quadratum (Sepp, [1845])
Cabares potrillo potrillo (Lucas, 1857)
Cephise aelius (Plötz, 1880)
Chioides albofasciatus (Hewitson, 1867)
Chioides catillus albius Evans, 1952
Chioides zilpa (Butler, 1872)
Codatractus alcaeus alcaeus (Hewitson, 1867)
Codatractus bryaxis (Hewitson, 1867)
Codatractus carlos carlos Evans, 1952
Codatractus cyda (Godman, 1901)
Cogia caicus caicus (Herrich-Schäffer, 1869)
Cogia cajeta cajeta (Herrich-Schäffer, 1869)
Cogia calchas (Herrich-Schäffer, 1869)
Drephalys alcmon (Cramer, 1779)
Drephalys oria Evans, 1952
Drephalys oriander (Hewitson, 1867)
Dyscophellus diaphorus (Magille & Boullet, 1912)
Dyscophellus phraxanor lama Evans, 1952
Dyscophellus ramon Evans, 1952
Entheus crux Steinhauser, 1989
Epargyreus aspina Evans, 1952
Epargyreus clavicornis gaumeri Godman & Salvin, 1893
Epargyreus exadeus cruza Evans, 1952
Epargyreus spina spina Evans, 1952
Hyalothyrus neleus pemphigargyra (Mabille, 1888)
Narcosius colossus colossus (Herrich-Schäffer, 1869)
Narcosius nazaraeus Steinhauser, 1986
Narcosius parisi helen (Evans, 1952)
Nascus phocus (Cramer, 1777)
Nascus solon corilla Evans, 1952
Nicephellus nicephorus (Hewitson, 1876)
Phanus marshallii (Kirby, 1880)
Phanus obscurior obscurior Kaye, 1925
Phanus vitreus (Stoll, 1781)
Phocides distans licinus (Möschler, 1879)
Phocides metrodorus nigrescens E. Bell, 1938
Phocides pigmalion pigmalion (Cramer, 1779)
Phocides polybius lilea (Reakirt, [1867])
Phocides thermus thermus (Mabille, 1883)
Polygonus savigny savigny (Latreille, [1824])
Polythrix asine (Hewitson, 1867)
Polythrix metallescens (Mabille, 1888)
Polythrix octomaculata (Sepp, [1844])
Porphyrogenes passalus (Herrich-Schäffer, 1869)
Porphyrogenes sula (Williams & Bell, 1940)
Porphyrogenes virgatus (Mabille, 1888)
Porphyrogenes zohra (Möschler, 1879)
Proteides mercurius mercurius (Fabricius, 1787)
Pseudonascus paulliniae (Sepp, [1842])
Ridens mephitis (Hewitson, 1876)
Spathilepia clonius (Cramer, 1775)
Tarsoctenus corytus gaudialis (Hewsitson, 1876)
Telemiades avitus (Stoll, 1781)
Telemiades fides Bell, 1949
Telemiades megallus Mabille, 1888
Telemiades oiclus (Mabille, 1889)
Thessia jalapus (Plötz, 1881)
Typhedanus ampyx (Godman & Salvin, 1893)
Typhedanus undulatus (Hewitson, 1867)
Udranomia kikkawai (Weeks, 1906)
Urbanus albimargo albimargo (Mabille, 1875)
Urbanus belli (Hayward, 1935)
Urbanus dorantes dorantes (Stoll, 1790)
Urbanus doryssus doryssus (Swainson, 1831)
Urbanus esmeraldus (Butler, 1877)
Urbanus procne (Plötz, 1881)
Urbanus pronta Evans, 1952
Urbanus proteus proteus (Linnaeus, 1758)
Urbanus simplicius (Stoll, 1790)
Urbanus tanna Evans, 1952
Urbanus teleus (Hübner, 1821)
Urbanus viterboana (Ehrmann, 1907)

Pyrginae
Achlyodes busirus heros Ehrmann, 1909
Achlyodes pallida (R. Felder, 1869)
Aethilla echina echina Hewitson, 1870
Aethilla lavochrea Butler, 1872
Anastrus neaeris neaeris (Möschler, 1879)
Anastrus petius peto Evans, 1953
Anastrus sempiternus sempiternus (Butler & H. Druce, 1872)
Anastrus tolimus tolimus (Plötz, 1884)
Anisochoria bacchus Evans, 1953
Antigonus corrosus Mabille, 1878
Antigonus erosus (Hübner, [1812])
Antigonus nearchus (Latreille, 1817)
Arteurotia tractipennis tractipennis Butler & H. Druce, 1872
Atarnes sallei (C. Felder & R. Felder, 1867)
Bolla clytius (Godman & Salvin, 1897)
Bolla cupreiceps (Mabille, 1891)
Bolla cylindus (Godman & Salvin, 1896)
Bolla imbras (Godman & Salvin, 1896)
Camptopleura theramenes Mabille, 1877
Carrhenes calidius Godman & Salvin, 1895
Carrhenes canescens canescens (R. Felder, 1869)
Carrhenes fuscescens fuscescens (Mabille, 1891)
Celaenorrhinus cynapes cynapes (Hewitson, 1870)
Celaenorrhinus fritzgaertneri (Bailey, 1880)
Celaenorrhinus monartus (Plötz, 1884)
Celaenorrhinus stola Evans, 1952
Chalypyge chalybea chloris (Evans, 1951)
Chiomara georgina georgina (Reakirt, 1868)
Chiomara mithrax (Möschler, 1879)
Cycloglypha thrasibulus thrasibulus (Fabricius, 1793)
Cyclosemia anastomosis Mabille, 1878
Cyclosemia pedro R. Williams & E. Bell, 1940
Doberes anticus (Plötz, 1884)
Eantis thraso (Hübner, [1807])
Ebrietas anacreon anacreon (Staudinger, 1876)
Ebrietas evanidus Mabille, 1898
Elbella patrobas patrobas (Hewitson, 1857)
Elbella scylla (Ménétriés, 1855)
Erynnis funeralis (Scudder & Burgess, 1870)
Erynnis tristis tatius (W. H. Edwards, 1883)
Gesta invisus (Butler & H. Druce, 1872)
Gorgopas chlorocephala chlorocephala (Herrich-Schäffer, 1870)
Gorgythion begga pyralina (Möschler, 1877)
Gorgythion vox Evans, 1953
Helias cama Evans, 1953
Heliopetes alana (Reakirt, 1868)
Heliopetes arsalte (Linnaeus, 1758)
Heliopetes laviana laviana (Hewitson, 1868)
Heliopetes macaira macaira (Reakirt, [1867])
Melanopyge erythrosticta (Godman & Salvin, 1879)
Mylon jason (Ehrmann, 1907)
Mylon lassia (Hewitson, 1868)
Mylon maimon (Fabricius, 1775)
Mylon pelopidas (Fabricius, 1793)
Myscelus amystis hages Godman & Salvin, 1893
Mysoria barcastus ambigua (Mabille & Boullet, 1908)
Nisoniades castolus (Hewitson, 1878)
Nisoniades ephora (Herrich-Schäffer, 1870)
Nisoniades godma Evans, 1953
Nisoniades macarius (Herrich-Schäffer, 1870)
Nisoniades rubescens (Möschler, 1877)
Noctuana lactifera bipuncta (Plötz, 1884)
Noctuana stator (Godman & Salvin, 1899)
Ouleus salvina Evans, 1953
Paches loxus gloriosus Röber, 1925
Pachyneuria licisca (Plötz, 1882)
Passova gellias (Godman & Salvin, 1893)
Pellicia arina Evans, 1953
Pellicia dimidiata dimidiata Herrich-Schäffer, 1870
Polyctor enops (Godman & Salvin, 1894)
Pyrgus adepta Plötz, 1884
Pyrgus oileus (Linnaeus, 1767)
Pyrrhopyge zenodorus Godman & Salvin, 1893
Pythonides grandis assecla Mabille, 1883
Pythonides jovianus amaryllis Staudinger, 1876
Pythonides proxenus (Godman & Salvin, 1895)
Quadrus cerialis (Stoll, 1782)
Quadrus contubernalis contubernalis (Mabille, 1883)
Quadrus lugubris lugubris (R. Felder, 1869)
Sostrata nordica Evans, 1953
Staphylus ascalaphus (Staudinger, 1876)
Staphylus azteca (Scudder, 1872)
Staphylus vulgata (Möschler, 1879)
Theagenes aegides (Herrich-Schäffer, 1869)
Timochares trifasciata trifasciata (Hewitson, 1868)
Tosta platypterus (Mabille, 1895)
Xenophanes tryxus (Cramer, 1780)
Yanguna cosyra (H. Druce, 1875)
Zera hyacinthinus hyacinthinus (Mabille, 1877)
Zera sp.
Zopyrion sandace Godman & Salvin, 1896

Hesperiinae
Aides brino (Stoll, 1781)
Aides dysoni Godman, 1900
Anatrytone mella (Godman, 1900)
Anatrytone potosiensis (H. Freeman, 1969)
Ancyloxypha arene (W. H. Edwards, 1871)
Anthoptus epictetus (Fabricius, 1793)
Anthoptus insignis (Plötz, 1882)
Argon lota (Hewitson, 1877)
Aroma aroma (Hewitson, 1867)
Atalopedes campestris huron (W. H. Edwards, 1863)
Callimormus juventus Scudder, 1872
Callimormus radiola radiola (Mabille, 1878)
Callimormus saturnus (Herrich-Schäffer, 1869)
Calpodes ethlius (Stoll, 1782)
Carystoides basoches (Latreille, [1824])
Carystoides hondura Evans, 1955
Carystoides lila Evans, 1955
Carystus phorcus phorcus (Cramer, 1777)
Cobalopsis nero (Herrich-Schäffer, 1869)
Cobalus fidicula (Hewitson, 1877)
Conga chydaea (Butler, 1877)
Copaeodes minima (W. H. Edwards, 1870)
Corticea corticea (Plötz, 1882)
Corticea lysias lysias (Plötz, 1883)
Cymaenes fraus (Godman, 1900)
Cymaenes trebius (Mabille, 1891)
Cymaenes tripunctus theogenis (Capronnier, 1874)
Cynea cynea (Hewitson, 1876)
Cynea diluta (Herrich-Schäffer, 1869)
Cynea irma (Möschler, 1879)
Damas clavus (Herrich-Schäffer, 1869)
Decinea decinea derisor (Mabille, 1891)
Dubiella fiscella belpa Evans, 1955
Enosis immaculata immaculata (Hewitson, 1868)
Eprius veleda veleda (Godman, 1900)
Euphyes ampa Evans, 1955
Euphyes peneia (Godman, 1900)
Eutocus facilis (Plötz, 1884)
Eutocus vetulus vetulus (Mabille, 1883)
Eutychide asema (Mabille, 1891)
Eutychide complana (Herrich-Schäffer, 1869)
Eutychide paria (Plötz, 1882)
Falga sciras Godman, 1901
Hylephila phyleus phyleus (Drury, 1773)
Justinia sp.
Lerema accius (J. E. Smith, 1797)
Lerema liris Evans, 1955
Lychnuchoides saptine (Godman & Salvin, 1879)
Methionopsis ina (Plötz, 1882)
Methionopsis typhon Godman, 1901
Metron zimra (Hewitson, 1877)
Mnaseas bicolor (Mabille, 1889)
Mnasicles geta Godman, 1901
Mnasilus allubita (Butler, 1877)
Mnasitheus cephoides Hayward, 1943
Mnasitheus chrysophrys (Mabille, 1891)
Monca crispinus (Plötz, 1882)
Morys lyde (Godman, 1900)
Morys micythus (Godman, 1900)
Morys valda Evans, 1955
Naevolus orius (Mabille, 1883)
Nastra julia (H. Freeman, 1945)
Nastra leucone leucone (Godman, 1900)
Neoxeniades luda (Hewitson, 1877)
Neoxeniades seron seron (Godman, 1901)
Niconiades incomptus Austin, 1997
Niconiades nikko Hayward, 1948
Niconiades viridis vista Evans, 1955
Nyctelius nyctelius nyctelius (Latreille, [1824])
Orses cynisca (Swainson, 1821)
Panoquina evadnes (Stoll, 1781)
Panoquina fusina viola Evans, 1955
Panoquina hecebolus (Scudder, 1872)
Panoquina lucas (Fabricius, 1793)
Panoquina ocola (W. H. Edwards, 1863)
Panoquina pauper pauper (Mabille, 1878)
Papias dictys Godman, 1900
Papias subcostulata (Herrich-Schäffer, 1870)
Paracarystus hypargyra (Herrich-Schäffer, 1869)
Parphorus storax storax (Mabille, 1891)
Perichares adela (Hewitson, 1867)
Perichares aurina Evans, 1955
Phanes aletes (Geyer, 1832)
Poanes zabulon (Boisduval & Le Conte, [1837])
Polites subreticulata (Plötz, 1883)
Polites vibex praeceps (Scudder, 1872)
Pompeius pompeius (Latreille, [1824])
Quasimellana eulogius (Plötz, 1882)
Quasimellana myron (Godman, 1900)
Quinta cannae (Herrich-Schäffer, 1869)
Remella remus (Fabricius, 1798)
Remella vopiscus (Herrich-Schäffer, 1869)
Rhinthon osca (Plötz, 1882)
Saliana antoninus (Latreille, [1824])
Saliana esperi esperi Evans, 1955
Saliana longirostris (Sepp, [1840])
Saliana saladin saladin Evans, 1955
Saliana triangularis (Kaye, 1914)
Synapte pecta Evans, 1955
Synapte salenus salenus (Mabille, 1893)
Talides cantra Evans, 1955
Talides sergestus (Cramer, 1775)
Thespieus dalman (Latreille, [1824]) PBL
Thoon modius (Mabille, 1889)
Thracides arcalaus (Stoll, 1782)
Thracides phidon (Cramer, 1779)
Tirynthia conflua (Herrich-Schäffer, 1869)
Tromba xanthura (Godman, 1901)
Vacerra litana (Hewitson, 1866)
Vehilius inca (Scudder, 1872)
Vehilius stictomenes illudens (Mabille, 1891)
Vertica verticalis coatepeca (Schaus, 1902)
Vettius aurelius (Plötz, 1882)
Vettius fantasos (Cramer, 1780)
Vettius lafrenaye pica (Herrich-Schäffer, 1869)
Vettius onaca Evans, 1955
Wallengrenia otho clavus (Erichson, [1849])
Wallengrenia otho otho (J. E. Smith, 1797)
Xeniades orchamus orchamus (Cramer, 1777)
Zariaspes mys (Hübner, [1808])
Zenis minos (Latreille, [1824])

Pieridae

Dismorphiinae
Dismorpha crisia steinhauseri J. & R. G. de la Maza, 1984
Dismorphia amphione praxinoe (Doubleday, 1844)
Dismorphia theucharila fortunata (Lucas, 1854)
Enantia albania albania (H. Bates, 1864)
Enantia jethys (Boisduval, 1836)
Enantia lina marion Godman & Salvin 1889
Lieinix nemesis atthis (Doubleday, 1842)
Pseudopieris nehemia francisca Lamas, 1979

Coliadinae
Abaeis nicippe (Cramer, 1779)
Anteos clorinde (Godart, [1824])
Anteos maerula (Fabricius, 1775)
Aphrissa boisduvalii (C. Felder & R. Felder, 1861)
Aphrissa statira statira (Cramer, 1777)
Eurema agave millerorum Llorente & Luis, 1987
Eurema albula celata (R. Felder, 1869)
Eurema boisduvaliana (C. Felder & R. Felder, 1865)
Eurema daira eugenia (Wallengren, 1860)
Eurema mexicana mexicana (Boisduval, 1836)
Eurema salome jamapa (Reakirt, 1866)
Eurema xanthochlora xanthochlora (Kollar, 1850)
Nathalis iole iole Boisduval, 1836
Phoebis agarithe agarithe (Boisduval, 1836)
Phoebis argante (Fabricius, 1775)
Phoebis neocypris virgo (Butler, 1870)
Phoebis philea philea (Linnaeus, 1763)
Phoebis sennae marcellina (Cramer, 1777)
Pyrisitia dina westwoodi (Boisduval, 1836)
Pyrisitia lisa centralis (Herrich Schäffer, 1865)
Pyrisitia nise nelphe (R. Felder, 1869)
Pyrisitia proterpia (Fabricius, 1775)
Rhabdodryas trite trite (Linnaeus, 1758)
Zerene cesonia cesonia (Stoll, 1790)

Pierinae
Archonias brassolis approximata (Butler, 1873)
Ascia monuste monuste (Linnaeus, 1764)
Catasticta nimbice ochracea (H. Bates, 1864)
Ganyra josephina josepha (Salvin & Godman, 1868)
Glutophrissa drusilla tenuis (Lamas, 1981)
Hesperocharis crocea crocea H. Bates, 1866
Itaballia demophile centralis Joicey & Talbot, 1928
Itaballia pandosia kicaha (Reakirt, 1863)
Leptophobia aripa elodia (Boisduval, 1836)
Melete lycimnia isandra (Boisduval, 1836)
Pereute charops nigricans Joicey & Talbot, 1928
Perrhybris pamela chajulensis J. & R. G. de la Maza, 1989
Pieriballia viardi viardi (Boisduval, 1836)

Lycaenidae

Theclinae
Arawacus dumenilii (Godart, [1824])
Arawacus sito (Boisduval, 1836)
Arawacus togarna (Hewitson, 1867)
Arcas cypria (Geyer, 1837)
Arcas imperialis (Cramer, 1775)
Atlides carpasia (Hewitson, 1868)
Aubergina paetus (Godman & Salvin, 1887)
Brangas carthaea (Hewitson, 1868)
Brangas neora (Hewitson, 1867)
Calycopis calus (Godart, [1824])
Calycopis cerata (Hewitson, 1877)
Calycopis demonassa (Hewitson, 1868)
Calycopis isobeon (Butler & H. Druce, 1872)
Calycopis pisis (Godman & Salvin, 1887)
Calycopis trebula (Hewitson, 1868)
Camissecla charichlorus (Butler & H. Druce, 1872)
Celmia celmus (Cramer, 1775)
Chalybs hassan (Stoll, 1790)
Chalybs janias (Cramer, 1779)
Chlorostrymon simaethis sarita (Skinner, 1895)
Chlorostrymon telea (Hewitson, 1868)
Cyanophrys agricolor (Butler & H. Druce, 1872)
Cyanophrys amyntor (Cramer, 1775)
Cyanophrys goodsoni (Clench, 1946)
Cyanophrys herodotus (Fabricius, 1793)
Cyanophrys longula (Hewitson, 1868)
Electrostrymon hugon (Godart, [1824])
Eumaeus childrenae (G. Gray, 1832)
Eumaeus toxea (Godart, [1824])
Evenus batesii (Hewitson, 1865)
Evenus coronata (Hewitson, 1865)
Evenus regalis (Cramer, 1775)
Iaspis andersoni Robbins, 2010
Iaspis temesa (Hewitson, 1868)
Janthecla janthina (Hewitson, 1867)
Kolana lyde (Godman & Salvin, 1887)
Lamprospilus collucia (Hewitson, 1877)
Laothus barajo (Reakirt, [1867])
Laothus oceia (Godman & Salvin, 1887)
Michaelus ira (Hewitson, 1867)
Michaelus thordesa (Hewitson, 1867)
Ministrymon azia (Hewitson, 1873)
Ministrymon una scopas (Godman & Salvin, 1887)
Nicolaea dolium (H. Druce, 1907)
Oenomaus atena (Hewitson, 1867)
Oenomaus ortygnus (Cramer, 1779)
Ostrinotes keila (Hewitson, 1869)
Ostrinotes purpuriticus (H. H. Druce, 1907)
Panthiades bathildis (C. Felder & R. Felder, 1865)
Panthiades bitias (Cramer, 1777)
Panthiades phaleros (Linnaeus, 1767)
Parrhasius moctezuma (Clench, 1971)
Parrhasius orgia (Hewitson, 1867)
Parrhasius polibetes (Stoll, 1781)
Pseudolycaena damo (H. Druce, 1875)
Rekoa marius (Lucas, 1857)
Rekoa meton (Cramer, 1779)
Rekoa palegon (Cramer, 1780)
Rekoa stagira (Hewitson, 1867)
Rekoa zebina (Hewitson, 1869)
Semonina semones (Godman & Salvin, 1887)
Strephonota sphinx (Fabricius, 1775)
Strephonota tephraeus (Geyer, 1837)
Strymon bazochii bazochii (Godart, [1824])
Strymon megarus (Godart, [1824])
Strymon serapio (Godman & Salvin, 1887)
Strymon yojoa (Reakirt, [1867])
Strymon ziba (Hewitson, 1868)
Theclopsis leos (Schaus, 1913)
Theclopsis mycon (Godman & Salvin, 1887)
Thereus cithonius (Godart, [1824])
Theritas hemon (Cramer, 1775)
Theritas lisus (Stoll, 1790)
Theritas mavors Hübner, 1818
Theritas theocritus (Fabricius, 1793)
Tmolus cydrara (Hewitson, 1868)
Tmolus echion echiolus (Draudt, 1920)
Ziegleria ceromia (Hewitson, 1877)
Ziegleria hesperitis (Butler & H. Druce, 1872)

Polyommatinae
Celastrina echo gozora (Boisduval, 1870)
Cupido comyntas texana (F. Chermock, 1945)
Echinargus huntingtoni hannoides (Clench, 1965)
Hemiargus ceraunus astenidas (Lucas, 1857)
Leptotes cassius cassidula (Boisduval, 1870)

Riodinidae

Euselasiinae
Euselasia argentea (Hewitson, 1871)
Euselasia aurantiaca aurantiaca (Godman & Salvin, 1868)
Euselasia cataleuca (R. Felder, 1869)
Euselasia chrysippe (H. W. Bates, 1866)
Euselasia eubule (R. Felder, 1869)
Euselasia hieronymi hieronymi (Godman & Salvin, 1868)
Euselasia hypophaea (Godman & Salvin, 1878)
Euselasia leucophyrna (Schaus, 1913)
Euselasia regipennis eupepla (Godman & Salvin, 1885)
Hades noctula Westwood, 1861

Riodininae
Ancyluris inca inca (Saunders, 1850)
Ancyluris jurgensenii jurgensenii (Saunders, 1850)
Anteros formosus micon H. Druce, 1875
Baeotis barce barce Hewitson, 1875
Baeotis macularia (Boisduval, 1870)
Baeotis zonata zonata R. Felder, 1869
Calephelis argyrodines (H. W. Bates, 1866)
Calephelis browni McAlpine, 1971
Calephelis fulmen Stichel, 1910
Calephelis laverna laverna (Godman & Salvin, 1886)
Calephelis mexicana McAlpine, 1971
Calephelis schausi McAlpine, 1971
Calephelis sixola McAlpine, 1971
Calephelis velutina (Godman & Salvin, 1878)
Calicosama lilina (Butler, 1870)
Calospila cilissa (Hewitson, 1863)
Calospila pelarge (Godman & Salvin, 1878)
Calydna sturnula (Geyer, 1837)
Caria rhacotis (Godman & Salvin, 1878)
Chalodeta lypera (H. W. Bates, 1868)
Charis anius (Cramer, 1776)
Chimastrum argenteum argenteum (H. W. Bates, 1866)
Detritivora barnesi (J. Hall & Harvey, 2001)
Emesis aurimna (Boisduval, 1870)
Emesis lucinda (Cramer, 1775)
Emesis lupina lupina Godman & Salvin, 1886
Emesis mandana furor Butler & H. Druce, 1872
Emesis ocypore aethalia H. W. Bates, 1868
Emesis tegula Godman & Salvin, 1886
Emesis tenedia C. Felder & R. Felder, 1861
Eurybia elvina elvina Stichel, 1910
Eurybia lycisca Westwood, 1851
Eurybia patrona persona Staudinger, 1876
Exoplisia cadmeis (Hewitson, 1866)
Hyphilaria thasus (Stoll, 1780)
Hypophylla sudias sudias (Hewitson, [1858])
Hypophylla zeurippa Boisduval, 1836
Isapis agyrtus hera Godman & Salvin, 1886
Juditha caucana (Stichel, 1911)
Lasaia agesilas callaina Clench, 1972
Lasaia maria maria Clench, 1972
Lasaia sula sula Staudinger, 1888
Leucochimona lagora (Herrich-Schäffer, [1853])
Leucochimona lepida nivalis (Godman & Salvin, 1885)
Lyropteryx lyra cleadas H. Druce, 1875
Melanis cephise (Menetries, 1855)
Melanis electron melantho (Menetries, 1865)
Melanis pixe sanguinea (Stichel, 1910)
Menander menander purpurata (Godman & Salvin, 1878)
Menander pretus picta (Godman & Salvin, 1886)
Mesene croceella H. W. Bates, 1865
Mesene margaretta margaretta (A. White, 1843)
Mesene phareus (Cramer, 1777)
Mesosemia gaudiolum H. W. Bates, 1865
Mesosemia lamachus Hewitson, 1857
Mesosemia telegone telegone (Boisduval, 1836)
Mesosemia zonalis Godman & Salvin, 1885
Monethe albertus rudolpus Godman & Salvin, 1885
Napaea eucharila (H. W. Bates, 1867)
Notheme erota diadema Stichel, 1910
Nymphidium ascolia ascolia Hewitson, [1853]
Pachythone gigas nigriciliata Schaus, 1913
Peropthalma lasus Westwood, 1851
Peropthalma tullius (Fabricius, 1787)
Pirascca tyriotes (Godman & Salvin, 1878)
Pseudonymphidia clearista (Butler, 1871)
Rhetus arcius castigatus Stichel, 1909
Rhetus periander Stichel, 1910
Sarota acantus (Stoll, 1781)
Sarota chrysus (Stoll, 1781)
Sarota gamelia gamelia Godman & Salvin, 1886
Sarota myrtea Godman & Salvin, 1886
Sarota subtessellata (Schaus, 1913)
Setabis lagus jansoni (Butler, 1870)
Symmachia accusatrix Westwood, 1851
Symmachia probetor probetor (Stoll, 1782)
Synargis mycone (Hewitson, 1865)
Synargis nymphidioides nymphidioides (Butler, 1872)
Synargis phliasus velabrum (Godman & Salvin, 1878)
Theope cratylus Godman & Salvin, 1886
Theope eudocia Westwood, 1851
Theope eupolis Schaus, 1890
Theope mundula Stichel, 1926
Theope pedias Herrich-Schäffer, [1853]
Theope phaeo Prittwitz, 1865
Theope pieridoides C. Felder & R. Felder, 1865
Theope publius incompositus J. Hall, 1999
Theope virgilius (Fabricius, 1793)
Thisbe lycorias (Hewitson, [1853])
Voltina umbra (Boisduval, 1870)
Voltinia theata Stichel, 1910

Nymphalidae

Libytheinae
Libytheana carinenta mexicana Michener, 1943

Danainae
Anetia thirza thirza Geyer, [1833]
Danaus eresimus montezuma Talbot, 1943
Danaus gilippus thersippus (H. W. Bates, 1863)
Danaus plexippus plexippus (Linnaeus, 1758)
Lycorea halia atergatis (E. Doubleday, [1847])
Lycorea ilione albescens (Distant, 1876)

Ithomiini
Aeria eurimedia pacifica Godman & Salvin, 1879
Callithomia hezia hedila Godman & Salvin, 1879
Ceratinia tutia (Hewitson, 1852)
Dircenna dero (Hübner, 1823)
Dircenna jemina (Geyer, 1837)
Dircenna klugi (Geyer, 1837)
Episcada salvinia salvinia (H. Bates, 1864)
Godyris nero (Hewitson, [1855])
Godyris zavaleta sosunga (Reakirt, [1866])
Greta annette (Guérin-Méneville, [1844])
Greta andromica lyra (Salvin, 1869)
Greta morgane oto (Hewitson, [1855])
Hypoleria lavinia cassotis (H. W. Bates, 1864)
Hyposcada virginiana virginiana (Hewitson, 1855)
Hypothyris euclea valora (Haensch, 1909)
Hypothyris lycaste dionaea (Hewitson, 1854)
Ithomia patilla Hewitson, 1852
Mechanitis lysimnia utemaia Reakirt, 1866
Mechanitis menapis saturata Godman, 1901
Mechanitis polymnia lycidice H. W. Bates, 1864
Melinaea lilis imitata H. Bates, 1864
Napeogenes tolosa tolosa (Hewitson, 1855)
Oleria paula (Weymer, 1883)
Oleria zea zea (Hewitson, [1855])
Pteronymia alcmena (Godman & Salvin, 1877)
Pteronymia artena artena (Hewitson, [1855])
Pteronymia cotytto cotytto (Guérin-Méneville, [1844])
Pteronymia simplex fenochioi Lamas, 1978
Thyridia psidii melantho H. Bates, 1866
Tithorea harmonia salvadoris Staudinger, 1885
Tithorea tarricina pinthias Godman & Salvin, 1878

Limenitidinae
Adelpha barnesia leucas Fruhstorfer, 1913
Adelpha basiloides (H. W. Bates, 1865)
Adelpha boeotia oberthurii (Boisduval, 1870)
Adelpha cocala lorzae (Boisduval, 1870)
Adelpha cytherea marcia Fruhstorfer, 1913
Adelpha delinita utina A. Hall, 1938
Adelpha donysa albifilum Steinhauser, 1974
Adelpha erymanthis erymanthis Godman & Salvin, 1884
Adelpha felderi (Boisduval, 1870)
Adelpha fessonia fessonia (Hewitson, 1847)
Adelpha iphicleola iphicleola (H. W. Bates, 1864)
Adelpha iphiclus iphiclus (Linnaeus, 1758)
Adelpha leuceria leuceria (H. Druce, 1874)
Adelpha leuceroides Beutelspacher, 1975
Adelpha lycorias melanthe (H. W. Bates, 1864)
Adelpha malea fundania Fruhstorfer, 1915
Adelpha melanthe melanthe (H. Bates, 1864)
Adelpha messana messana (C. Felder & R. Felder, 1867)
Adelpha milleri Beutelspacher, 1976
Adelpha naxia naxia (C. Felder & R. Felder, 1867)
Adelpha paraena massilia (C. Felder & R. Felder, 1867)
Adelpha phylaca phylaca (H. W. Bates, 1866)
Adelpha phylaca pseudothalia A. Hall, 1938
Adelpha pithys (H. W. Bates, 1864)
Adelpha salmoneus salmonides A. Hall 1938
Adelpha serpa celerio (H. W. Bates, 1864)

Heliconiinae
Actinote anteas (Doubleday, [1847])
Actinote guatemalena guatemalena (H. Bates, 1864)
Agraulis vanillae incarnata (N. Riley, 1926)
Altinote ozomene nox (H. W. Bates, 1864)
Dione juno huascuma (Reakirt, 1866)
Dione moneta poeyii ( Butler, 1873)
Dryadula phaetusa (Linnaeus, 1758)
Dryas iulia moderata (N. Riley, 1926)
Eueides aliphera gracilis Stichel, 1904
Eueides isabella eva (Fabricius, 1793)
Eueides lineata Salvin & Godman, 1868
Eueides procula asidia Schaus, 1920
Euptoieta hegesia meridiania Stichel, 1938
Heliconius charitonia vazquezae Comstock & Brown, 1950
Heliconius cydno galanthus H. W. Bates, 1864
Heliconius doris viridis Staudinger, 1885
Heliconius erato petiverana (Doubleday, 1847)
Heliconius hecale discomaculatus Weymer, 1891
Heliconius hecale zuleika Hewitson, 1854
Heliconius hecalesia octavia H. W. Bates, 1866
Heliconius hortense Guérin-Méneville, [1844]
Heliconius ismenius telchinia Doubleday, 1847
Heliconius sapho leuce Doubleday, 1847
Heliconius sara veraepacis H. W. Bates, 1864
Philaethria diatonica (Fruhstorfer, 1912)

Apaturinae
Asterocampa idyja argus (H. Bates, 1864)
Doxocopa callianira (Menetries, 1855)
Doxocopa cyane mexicana Bryk, 1953
Doxocopa laure laure (Drury, 1773)
Doxocopa laurentina cherubina (C. Felder & R. Felder, 1867)
Doxocopa pavon theodora (Lucas, 1857)

Biblidinae
Biblis hyperia aganisa Boisduval, 1836
Mestra amymone (Ménétriés, 1857)

Catonephelini
Catonephele chromis godmani Stichel, 1901
Catonephele mexicana Jenkins & R. G. de la Maza, 1985
Catonephele numilia esite (R. Felder, 1869)
Ectima erycinoides C. Felder & R. Felder, 1867
Eunica alcmena alcmena (Doubleday, [1847])
Eunica alpais excelsa Godman & Salvin, 1877
Eunica caelina agusta H. W. Bates, 1866
Eunica caralis caralis (Hewitson, [1857])
Eunica chlororhoa mira Godman & Salvin, 1877
Eunica malvina albida Jenkins, 1990
Eunica monima (Stoll, 1782)
Eunica mygdonia omoa A, Hall, 1919
Eunica pomona amata H. Druce, 1874
Eunica sydonia caresa (Hewitson, [1857])
Eunica tatila tatila (Herrich-Schäffer [1885])
Eunica volumna venusia (C. Felder & R. Felder, 1867)
Myscelia cyaniris cyaniris Doubleday, [1848]
Myscelia ethusa pattenia Butler & H. Druce, 1872
Nessaea aglaura aglaura (Doubleday, [1848])

Ageroniini
Hamadryas amphinome mexicana (Lucas, 1853)
Hamadryas atlantis atlantis (H. Bates, 1864)
Hamadryas februa ferentina (Godart, [1824])
Hamadryas feronia farinulenta (Fruhstorfer, 1916)
Hamadryas fornax fornacalia (Fruhstorfer, 1907)
Hamadryas glauconome glauconome (H. Bates, 1864)
Hamadryas guatemalena guatemalena (H. Bates, 1864)
Hamadryas iphthime joannae Jenkins, 1983
Hamadryas laodamia saurites (Fruhstorfer, 1916)

Epiphelini
Bolboneura sylphis sylphis (H. Bates, 1864)
Epiphile adrasta adrasta Hewitson, 1861
Nica flavilla canthara (Doubleday, 1849)
Pyrrhogyra edocla edocla Doubleday, [1848]
Pyrrhogyra neaerea hypensor Godman & Salvin, 1884
Pyrrhogyra otolais otolais H. W. Bates, 1864
Temenis laothoe hondurensis Fruhstorfer, 1907

Eubagini
Dynamine artemisia (Fabricius, 1793)
Dynamine ate (Godman & Salvin, 1883)
Dynamine dyonis Geyer, 1837
Dynamine paulina thalassina (Boisduval, 1870)
Dynamine postverta mexicana d'Almeida, 1952
Dynamine theseus (C. Felder & R. Felder, 1861)

Callicorini
Callicore astarte patelina (Hewitson, 1853)
Callicore lyca lyca (Doubleday, [1847])
Callicore pitheas (Latreille, [1813])
Callicore texa titania (Salvin, 1869)
Callicore tolima guatemalena (H. Bates), 1866
Callicore tolima peralta (Dillon, 1948)
Diaethria anna anna (Guérin-Méneville, [1844])
Diaethria astala astala (Guérin-Méneville, [1844])
Diaethria pandama (Doubleday, [1848])

Cyrestinae
Marpesia berania fruhstorferi (Seitz, 1914)
Marpesia chiron (Fabricius, 1775)
Marpesia corita corita (Westwood, 1850)
Marpesia marcella valetta (Butler & H. Druce, 1872)
Marpesia merops (Doyère, [1840])
Marpesia petreus (Cramer, 1776)
Marpesia zerynthia dentigera (Fruhstorfer, 1907)

Nymphalinae

Coeini
Baeotus baeotus (Doubleday, [1849])
Historis acheronta acheronta (Fabricius, 1775)
Historis odius dious Lamas, 1995
Pycina zamba zelys Godman & Salvin, 1884

Nymphalini
Colobura dirce dirce (Linnaeus, 1758)
Hypanartia dione disjuncta Willmott et al., 2001
Hypartnartia lethe (Fabricius, 1793)
Smyrna blomfildia datis Fruhstorfer, 1908
Smyrna karwinskii Geyer, [1833]
Tigridia acesta (Linnaeus, 1758)
Vanessa cardui (Linnaeus, 1758)
Vanessa virginiensis (Drury, 1773)

Victorinini
Anartia fatima fatima (Fabricius, 1793)
Anartia jatrophae luteipicta (Fruhstorfer, 1907)
Siproeta epaphus epaphus (Latreille, 1813)
Siproeta stelenes biplagiata (Fruhstorfer, 1907)

Junoniini
Junonia evarete (Cramer, 1779)

Melitaeini
Anthanassa ardys (Hewitson, 1864)
Anthanassa argentea (Godman & Salvin, 1882)
Anthanassa atronia (H. Bates, 1866)
Anthanassa dracaena phlegias (Godman, 1901)
Anthanassa drusilla lelex (H. Bates, 1864)
Anthanassa drymaea (Godman & Salvin, 1878)
Anthanassa otanes otanes (Hewitson, 1864)
Anthanassa ptolyca ptolyca (H. Bates, 1864)
Anthanassa sitalces sitalces (Godman & Salvin, 1882)
Anthanassa tulcis (H. Bates, 1864)
Castilia griseobasalis (Röber, 1913)
Castilia myia (Hewitson, [1864])
Chlosyne ezra (Hewitson, 1864)
Chlosyne gaudialis gaudialis (H. Bates, 1864)
Chlosyne janais janais (Drury, 1782)
Chlosyne lacinia lacinia (Geyer, 1837)
Chlosyne theona theona (Menetries, 1855)
Eresia clio clio (Linnaeus, 1758)
Eresia phillyra phillyra Hewitson, 1852
Microtia elva elva H. Bates, 1864
Tegosa anieta luka (H. Bates, 1866)
Tegosa claudina (Eschscholtz, 1821)
Tegosa nigrella nigrella (H. Bates, 1866)

Charaxinae
Agrias aedon rodriguezi Schaus, 1918
Agrias amydon lacandona R. G. & J. de la Maza, 1999
Anaea aidea (Guérin-Méneville, [1844])
Archaeoprepona amphimachus amphiktion (Fruhstorfer, 1916)
Archaeoprepona demophon centralis (Fruhstorfer, 1905)
Archaeoprepona demophon gulina (Fruhstorfer, 1904)
Archaeoprepona menander phoebus (Boisduval, 1870)
Consul fabius cecrops (Doubleday, [1849])
Fountainea eurypyle confusa (A. Hall, 1929)
Memphis arginussa eubaena (Boisduval, 1870)
Memphis artacaena (Hewitson, 1869)
Memphis aureola (H. Bates, 1866)
Memphis beatrix (H. Druce, 1874)
Memphis dia dia (Godman & Salvin, 1884)
Memphis glauce centralis (Röber, 1916)
Memphis hedemanni (R. Felder, 1869)
Memphis lyceus (H. Druce, 1877)
Memphis mora orthesia (Godman & Salvin, 1884)
Memphis moruus boisduvali (W. Comstock, 1961)
Memphis neidhoeferi (Rotger, Escalante, & Coronado, 1965)
Memphis oenomais (Boisduval, 1870)
Memphis pithyusa pithyusa (R. Felder, 1869)
Memphis proserpina (Salvin, 1869)
Prepona dexamenus medinai Beutelspacher, 1981
Prepona laertes octavia Fruhstorfer, 1905
Prepona pylene gnorima H. Bates, 1865
Prepona pylene philetas Fruhstorfer, 1904
Siderone galanthis (Cramer, 1775)
Siderone syntyche syntyche Hewitson, [1854])
Zaretis callidryas (R. Felder, 1869)
Zaretis ellops (Ménétriés, 1855)
Zaretis itys itys (Cramer, 1777)

Satyrinae

Morphini
Antirrhea philoctetes lindigii C. Felder & R. Felder, 1862
Morpho achilles patroclus C. Felder & R. Felder, 1861
Morpho cypris aphrodite LeMoult & Réal, 1962
Morpho helenor montezuma (Guenée, 1859)
Morpho polyphemus catalina Corea & Chacón, 1984
Morpho polyphemus luna Butler, 1869
Morpho theseus arotos (Frustorfer, 1905)
Morpho theseus justitiae Salvin & Godman, 1868

Brassolinae
Caligo brasiliensis sulanus Fruhstorfer, 1904
Caligo illioneus oberon Butler, 1870
Caligo oedipus fruhstorferi Stichel, 1904
Caligo oileus scamander (Boisduval, 1870)
Caligo telemonius memnon (C. Felder & R. Felder, 1867)
Caligo uranus Herrich-Schäffer, 1850
Catoblepia orgetorix orgetorix (Hewitson, 1870)
Dynastor darius stygianus Buter, 1872
Dynastor macrosiris strix Bates, 1864
Eryphanis aesacus (Herrich-Schäffer, 1850)
Eryphanis lycomedon (C. Felder & R. Felder, 1862)
Narope testacea Godman & Salvin, 1878
Opsiphanes bogotanus alajuela Bristow, 1991
Opsiphanes boisduvallii Doubleday, [1849]
Opsiphanes cassiae castaneus Stichel, 1904
Opsiphanes cassina fabricii (Boisduval, 1870)
Opsiphanes invirae relucens Fruhstorfer, 1907
Opsiphanes quiteria quirinus Godman & Salvin, 1881
Opsiphanes tamarindi tamarindi C. Felder & R. Felder, 1861

Haeterini
Cithaerias pireta pireta (Stoll, 1780)
Pierella helvina incanescens Godman & Salvin, 1877
Pierella luna pallida (Salvin & Godman, 1868)
Pierella luna rubecula Salvin & Godman, 1868

Melanitini
Manataria hercyna maculata (Hopffer, 1874)

Satyrini
Cissia labe (Butler, 1870)
Cissia pompilia (C. Felder & R. Felder, 1867)
Cissia similis (Butler, 1867)
Cissia themis (Butler, 1867)
Cyllopsis hedemanni hedemanni R. Felder, 1869
Cyllopsis hilaria (Godman, 1901)
Cyllopsis pephredo (Godman, 1901)
Cyllopsis pyracmon pyracmon (Butler, [1867])
Cyllopsis steinhauserorum L. Miller, 1974
Cyllopsis suivalenoides L. Miller, 1974
Euptychia hilaria (C. Felder & R. Felder, 1867)
Euptychia westwoodi Butler, 1867
Hermeuptychia hermes (Fabricius, 1775)
Magneuptychia libye (Linnaeus, 1767)
Megeuptychia antonoe (Cramer, 1775)
Oxeoschistus tauropolis (Westwood, [1850])
Pareuptychia metaleuca (Boisduval, 1870)
Pareuptychia ocirrhoe (Fabricius, 1776)
Satyrotaygetis satyrina (H. W. Baters, 1865)
Taygetis laches (Fabricius, 1793)
Taygetis mermeria excavata Butler, 1868
Taygetis rufomarginata Staudinger, 1888
Taygetis thamyra (Cramer, 1779)
Taygetis virgilia (Cramer, 1776)
Taygetomorpha celia (Cramer, 1779)

Moths

Hepialoidea

Hepialidae
Druceiella sp.

Tineoidea

Psychidae
Cryptothelea gloverii (Packard, 1869)
Cryptothelea symmicta (Dyar, 1914)
Oiketicus geyeri Berg, 1877
Oiketicus kirbyi Guilding, 1827
Oiketicus sp.

Arrhenophanidae
Arrhenophanes perspicilla (Stoll, 1790)

Acrolophidae
Acrolophus sp.

Gracillarioidea

Gracillariidae
Phyllocnistis citrella Stainton, 1856

Yponomeutoidea

Yponomeutidae
Atteva aurea (Fabricius, 1798)

Plutellidae
Plutella xylostella (Linnaeus, 1758)

Heliodinidae
Aetole bella Chambers, 1875

Lyonetiidae
Perileucoptera coffeella (Guérin-Méneville, 1842)

Gelechioidea

Elachistidae
Ethmia catapeltica Meyrick, 1924
Ethmia lichyi Powell 1973
Ethmia perpulchra Walsingham, 1912
Ethmia scythropa Walsingham, 1912
Ethmia similatella Busck, 1920
Ethmia ungulatella Busck, 1914
Stenoma catenifer Walsingham, 1912
Stenoma exarata (Zeller, 1854)
Stenoma impressella (Busck, 1914)
Stenoma patens Meyrick, 1913

Glyphidoceridae
Glyphidocera spp. 1–4

Oecophoridae
Antaeotricha cosmoterma (Meyrick, 1930)
Antaeotricha particularis (Zeller, 1877)
Antaeotricha spp. 1–5
Cerconota anonella (Sepp, 1830)

Coleophoridae

Blastobasinae
Blastobasis sp.

Cosmopterigidae
Pyroderces badia (Hodges, 1962)
Pyroderces rileyi (Walsingham, 1882)

Gelechiidae
Keiferia lycopersicella (Walsingham, 1897)
Phthorimaea operculella (Zeller, 1873)
Sitotroga cerealella (Oliver, 1789)
Trichotaphe arotrosema (Walsingham, 1911)

Zygaenoidea

Megalopygidae
Aithorape sp.
Macara nigripes (Dyar, 1909)
Megalopyge albicollis (Walker, 1855)
Megalopyge lanata (Cramer, 1780)
Megalopyge opercularis J. E. Smith, 1797
Megalopyge sp.
Mesoscia dumilla Dyar, 1913
Mesoscia pusilla (Stoll, 1782)
Podalia contigua (Walker, 1886)
Podalia orsilochia (Cramer, 1775)
Podalia tympania (Druce, 1897)
Trosia nigropunctigera (D. S. Fletcher, 1982)

Limacodidae
Acharia horrida (Dyar, 1905)
Euclea bidiscalis Dyar, 1926
Euclea mesoamericana Epstein & Corrales, 2004
Euclea sp. 1
Euclea sp. 2
Miresa clarissa (Stoll, 1790)
Natada cecilia Corrales & Epstein, 2000
Natada confusa Corrales & Epstein, 2003
Natada fusca (Druce, 1887)
Parasa minima Schaus, 1892
Parasa joanae Epstein, 2004
Parasa viridogrisea Dyar, 1898
Perola invaria (Walker, 1855)
Perola sericea (Möschler, 1878)
Phobetron hipparchia (Cramer, [1777])
Prolimacodes undifera (Walker, 1855)
Prolimacodes triangulifera Schaus, 1896
Semyra finita Walker, 1855
Talima aurora Dyar, 1926
Talima postica Dyar, 1926

Dalceridae
Acraga coa (Schaus, 1892)
Acraga sp.
Dalcerides alba (Druce, 1887)
Dalcerides mesoa (Druce, 1887)
Dalcerides sp.
Paracraga argentea (Schaus, 1910)

Zygaenidae
Harrisina mystica (Walker, 1854)

Cossoidea

Cossidae
Aramos ramosa (Schaus, 1892)
Biocellata alfarae (Schaus, 1911)
Brypoctia strigifer (Dyar, 1910)
Cossula arpi Schaus, 1901
Cossula tacita (Druce, 1898)
Givira basiplaga (Schaus, 1905)
Givira daphne Druce, 1901
Givira juturna (Schaus, 1892)
Givira modisma Schaus, 1921
Inguromorpha sandelphon (Dyar, 1912)
Langsdorfia lunifera Dyar, 1937
Morpheis cognata (Walker, 1856)
Morpheis comisteon Schaus, 1911
Morpheis pyracmon (Cramer, 1780)

Sesioidea

Sesiidae
Carmenta mimosa Eichlin & Passoa, 1983
Melittia cucurbitae Harris, 1828
Sophona hondurasensis Eichlin, 1986

Castniidae

Castniinae
Amauta cacica procera (Boisduval, [1875])
Athis clitarcha (Westwood, 1877)
Athis inca inca (Walker, 1854)
Divana diva diva (Butler, [1870])
Telchin atymnius futilis (Walker, 1856)
Telchin licus (Drury, 1773)

Choreutoidea

Choreutidae
Brenthia sp.
Hemerophila tristis (Felder & Rogenhofer, 1875)
Tortyra sp.

Tortricoidea

Tortricidae
Aethesoides hondurasica Razowski, 1986
Amorbia productana (Walker, 1863)
Cydia semicirculana (Walker, 1863)
Eugnosta emarcida (Razowski & Becker 1986)
Eugnosta fraudulenta Razowski & Becker 2007
Icteralaria idiochroma J. W. Brown, 1996
Mictopsichia cubae Razowski, 2009
Mimeugnosta particeps Razowski, 1986
Platynota rostrana (Walker, 1863)
Pseudatteria volcanica (Butler, 1872)
Rhyacionia frustrana (Comstock, 1880)
Sparganothina anopla B. Landry, 2001

Alucitoidea

Alucitidae
Alucita sp.

Pterophoroidea

Pterophoridae
Adaina beckeri Gielis, 1992
Adaina ipomoeae Bigot & Etienne, 2009
Adaina simplicius (Grossbeck, 1917)
Amblyptilia landryi Gielis, 2006
Anstenoptilia marmarodactyla (Dyar, [1903])
Hellinsia sp. 1-3
Leptodeuterocopus sp.
Lioptilodes albistriolatus (Zeller, 1877)
Megalorhipida dulcis (Walsingham, 1915)
Megalorhipida leucodactylus (Fabricius, 1794)
Michaelophorus dentiger (Meyrick, 1916)
Michaelophorus nubilus (Felder & Rogenhofer, 1875)
Ochyrotica sp.
Sphenarches anisodactylus (Walker, 1864)
Stenoptilodes brevipennis (Zeller, 1874)

Hyblaeoidea

Hyblaeidae
Hyblaea puera (Cramer, 1777)

Pyraloidea

Crambidae

Crambinae
Argyria sp.
Argyria centrifugens Dyar, 1914
Diatraea lineolata (Walker, 1856)
Diatraea saccharalis (Fabricius, 1794)
Fissicrambus minuellus (Walker, 1863)
Microcausta sp.
Microcramboides meretricellus (Schaus, 1913)
Microcrambus pusionellus (Zeller, 1863)
Microcrambus tactellus (Dyar, 1914)
Myelobia smerintha Hübner, [1821]
Parapediasia tenuistrigata (Zeller, 1881)
Tortriculladia eucosmella (Dyar, 1914)
Tortriculladia sp.

Schoenobiinae
Proschoenobius subcervinellus (Walker, 1863)
Rupela albina Becker & Solis, 1990

Glaphyriinae
Aethiophysa dimotalis (Walker, [1866])
Cosmopterosis spatha Solis, 2009
Dicymolomia metalophota (Hampson, 1897)
Hellula phidilealis (Walker, 1859)
Lipocosma calla (Kaye, 1901)
Pseudoligostigma enareralis (Dyar, 1914)
Schacontia ysticalis (Dyar, 1925)

Musotiminae
Neurophyseta camptogrammalis Hampson, 1912
Undulambia polystichalis Capps, 1965

Midilinae
Dismidila atoca Dyar, 1914
Dismidila drepanoides Monroe, 1970
Dismidila sp.
Midila centralis Munroe, 1970
Midila daphne daphne (Druce, 1895)

Acentropinae
Argyractoides nr. lucianalis (Schaus, 1924)
Argyractoides leucogonialis (Hampson, 1906)
Argyractoides sp.
Aulacodes aechmialis Guenée, 1854 KC x
Aulacodes sp. 1-2
Chrysendeton romanalis (Druce, 1896)
Neargyractis sp.
Oxyelophila necomalis (Dyar, 1914)
Oxyelophila puralis (Schaus, 1912)
Oxyelophila sp.
Parapoynx endoralis (Walker, 1859)
Petrophila argyrolepta (Dyar, 1914)
Petrophila iolepta (Dyar, 1914)
Petrophila mignonalis (Dyar, 1914)
Petrophila zelota (Dyar, 1914)
Petrophila parvissimalis (Schaus, 1912)
Petrophila spp. 1–8
Usingeriessa onyxalis (Hampson, 1897)

Odontiinae
Dicepolia rufitinctalis (Hampson, 1899)

Evergestinae
Symphysa sp.
Trischistognatha pyrenealis (Walker, 1859)

Pyraustinae
Anania inclusalis (Walker, [1866])
Aponia minnithalis (Druce, 1895)
Epicorsia alvilalis Amsel, 1954
Epicorsia sp.
Hyalorista limasalis (Walker, 1886)
Hyalorista taeniolalis (Guenée, 1854)
Munroeodes thalesalis (Walker, 1859)
Oenobotys vinotinctalis (Hampson, 1895)
Portentomorpha xanthialis (Guenée, 1854)
Pyrausta bicoloralis (Guenée, 1854)
Pyrausta insignitalis (Guenée, 1854)
Triuncidia ossealis (Hampson, 1899)

Spilomelinae
Agathodes designalis Guenée, 1854
Anarmodia nebulosalis Dognin, 1903
Apilocrocis excelsalis (Schaus, 1912)
Apogeshna acestealis (Walker, 1859)
Apogeshna stenialis (Guenée, 1854)
Arthromastix lauralis (Walker, 1859)
Asturodes fimbriauralis (Guenée, 1854)
Ategumia actealis (Walker, 1859)
Ategumia dilecticolor (Dyar, 1912)
Ategumia ebulealis (Guenée, 1854)
Ategumia matutinalis (Guenée 1854)
Ategumia sp.
Atomopteryx doeri Walsingham, 1891
Azochis gripusalis Walker, 1859
Azochis mactalis (Felder & Rogenhofer, 1875)
Blepharomastix benetinctalis (Dyar, 1914)
Blepharomastix coeneusalis (Walker, 1859)
Blepharomastix costaliparilis Munroe, 1995
Bocchoropsis plenilinealis (Dyar, 1917)
Cirrhocephalina brunneivena (Hampson, 1913)
Coenostolopsis apicalis (Lederer, 1863)
Compacta hirtalis (Guenée, 1854)
Conchylodes arcifera Hampson, 1912
Conchylodes nolckenialis (Snellen, 1875)
Conchylodes platinalis (Guenée, 1854)
Conchylodes salamisalis Druce, 1895
Cryptobotys zoilusalis (Walker, 1859)
Desmia albisectalis (Dognin, 1905)
Desmia bajulalis Guenée, 1854
Desmia cristinae Schaus, 1912
Desmia daedala Druce, 1895
Desmia extrema (Walker, 1856)
Desmia odontoplaga Hampson, 1899
Desmia sepulchralis Guenée, 1854
Desmia vulcanalis (Felder & Rogenhofer, 1875)
Desmia sp. 1-4
Deuterophysa albilunalis (Hampson, 1913)
Diaphania arguta (Lederer, 1863)
Diaphania costata (Fabricius, 1794)
Diaphania esmeralda (Hampson, 1899)
Diaphania exclusalis (Walker, [1866])
Diaphania hyalinata (Linnaeus, 1767)
Diaphania latilimbalis (Guenée, 1854)
Diaphania modialis (Dyar, 1912)
Diaphania nitidalis (Cramer, 1781)
Diaphania sp.
Dichocrocis clystalis Schaus, 1920
Dichocrocis sabatalis (Druce, 1895)
Dichocrosis tlapalis Schaus, 1920
Epipagis fenestralis (Hübner, 1796)
Eulepte concordalis Hübner, [1825] 1826
Glyphodes rubrocinctalis (Guenée, 1854)
Glyphodes sibillalis sibillalis Walker, 1859
Gonocausta zephyralis Lederer, 1863
Herpetogramma bipunctalis (Fabricius, 1794)
Herpetogramma cervinicosta (Hampson, 1918)
Herpetogramma salbialis (Hampson, 1899)
Hoterodes ausonia (Cramer, 1777)
Hymenia perspectalis (Hübner, 1796)
Lamprosema cayugalis Schaus, 1920
Lamprosema lunulalis Hübner, 1823
Lamprosema nr. moccalis Schaus, 1920
Lamprosema sp.
Leucochroma sp. nr. corope (Cramer, 1781)
Leucochromodes melusinalis (Walker, 1859)
Lineodes fontella Walsingham, 1913
Lineodes mesodonta Hampson, 1913
Lineodes triangulalis Möschler, 1890
Lineodes tridentalis Hampson, 1913
Lygropia acastalis (Walker, 1859)
Lypotigris reginalis (Cramer, 1781)
Maracayia chlorisalis (Walker, 1859)
Marasmia cochrusalis (Walker, 1859)
Marasmia trapezalis (Guenée, 1854) USNM
Maruca vitrata (Fabricius, 1787)
Massepha lupa (Druce, 1899)
Megastes grandalis Guenée, 1854
Megastes sp.
Metoeca foedalis (Guenée, 1854)
Microphysetica hermeasalis (Walker, 1859)
Microthyris anormalis (Guenée, 1854)
Microthyris prolongalis (Guenée, 1854)
Mimophobetron pyropsalis (Hampson, 1904)
Neoleucinodes elegantalis (Guenée, 1854)
Neoleucinodes imperialis (Guenée, 1854)
Nonazochis graphialis (Schaus, 1912)
Omiodes humeralis Guenée, 1854
Omiodes indicata (Fabricius, 1775)
Omiodes janzeni Gentili & Solis, 1998
Omiodes martini Amsel, 1956
Omiodes martyralis (Lederer, 1863)
Omiodes pandaralis (Walker, 1858)
Omiodes simialis Guenée, 1854
Omiodes stigmosalis (Warren, 1892)
Omiodes spp. 1–5
Palpita flegia (Cramer, 1777)
Palpusia terminalis (Dognin, 1910)
Palpusia sp.
Pantographa expansalis (Lederer, 1863)
Pantographa suffusalis Druce, 1895
Pantographa sp.
Phaedropsis chromalis (Guenée, 1854)
Phaedropsis maritzalis (Schaus, 1920)
Phostria mapetalis (Schaus, 1912)
Phostria tedea (Cramer, 1781)
Phostria sp.
Phrygonodes plicatalis Guenée, 1854
Pilocrocis cryptalis (Druce, 1895)
Pilocrocis cyranoalis Schaus, 1920
Pilocrocis ramentalis Lederer, 1863
Pilocrocis sp.
Polygrammodes elevata (Fabricius, 1794)
Polygrammodes flavidalis (Guenée, 1854)
Polygrammodes hyalomaculata hyalomaculata Dognin, 1908
Polygrammodes ponderalis (Guenée, 1854)
Polygrammodes rufinalis Hampson, 1899
Prenesta fenestrinalis (Guenée, 1854)
Prenesta scyllalis (Walker, 1859)
Psara prumnides (Druce, 1895)
Pycnarmon cecinalis (Dognin, 1897)
Sacculosia isaralis (Felder & Rogenhofer, 1875)
Salbia haemorrhoidalis (Guenée, 1854)
Salbia pepitalis (Guenée, 1854)
Salbia tytiusalis (Walker, 1859)
Samea delicata Kaye, 1923
Samea ecclesialis Guenée, 1854
Samea multiplicalis (Guenée, 1854)
Samea nicaeusalis (Walker, 1859)
Sisyracera subulalis (Guenée, 1854)
Sparagmia gonoptera (Latreille, 1828)
Spilomela discordens Dyar, 1914
Spilomela pantheralis (Geyer, 1832)
Spilomela sp.
Spoladea recurvalis (Fabricius, 1775)
Steniodes acuminalis (Dyar, 1914)
Steniodes mendica (Hedemann, 1894)
Sufetula diminutalis (Walker, [1866])
Syllepis hortalis (Walker, 1859)
Syllepte amando (Cramer, 1779)
Syllepte belialis (Walker, 1859)
Syllepte dioptalis (Walker, [1866])
Synclera chlorophasma (Butler, 1878)
Synclera jarbusalis (Walker, 1859)
Syngamia florella (Cramer, 1781)
Syngamilyta apicolor (Druce, 1902)
Syngamilyta samarialis (Druce, 1899)
Terastia meticulosalis Guenée, 1854
Trichaea pilicornis Herrich-Schäffer, 1866
Trichaea sp.

Pyralidae

Pyralinae
Hypsopygia craspedalis (Hampson, 1906)
Hypsopygia graafialis (Snellen, 1875)
Hypsopygia resectalis (Lederer, 1863)

Chrysauginae
Azamora splendens (Druce, 1895)
Bonchis munitalis (Lederer, 1863)
Bonchis scoparioides Walker, 1862
Caphys biliniata (Stoll, 1781)
Caphys subrosealis (Walker, [1866])
Carcha hersilialis Walker, 1859
Carcha violalis Hampson, 1897
Clydonopteron pomponius Druce, 1895
Clydonopteron sp.
Dasycnema obliqualis (Hampson, 1897)
Galasa strenualis Dyar, 1914
Galasa striginervalis Hampson, 1906
Galasa sp. 1-3
Hyperparachma bursarialis (Walker, [1866])
Hyperparachma sp.
Lophopleura eurzonalis Hampson, 1897
Parachma meterythra Hampson, 1897
Salobrena atropurpurea Hampson, 1906
Salobrena vacuana (Walker, 1863)
Tetrachistis paula Schaus, 1904
Xantippe olivalis Dyar, 1914
Zanclodes falculalis Ragonot, 1891

Epipaschiinae
Accinctapubes albifasciata (Druce, 1902)
Anarnatula sylea (Druce, 1899)
Arnatula circumlucens Dyar, 1914
Calybitia adolescens (Dyar, 1914)
Carthara albicosta Walker, 1865
Chloropaschia selecta (Schaus, 1912)
Deuterollyta cantianilla (Schaus, 1925)
Deuterollyta majuscula Herrich-Schäffer, 1871
Deuterollyta ragonoti Möschler, 1890
Epipaschia mesoleucalis (Hampson, 1916)
Lepidogma modana Schaus, 1922
Macalla thyrsisalis Walker, [1859]
Macalla finstanalis Schaus, 1922
Milgithea melanoleuca (Hampson, 1896)
Pandoflabella olivescens (Schaus, 1912)
Phidotricha erigens Ragonot, 1888
Pococera narthusa Schaus, 1913
Pococera gelidalis (Walker, [1866])
Pococera sp.
Tallula fovealis Hampson, 1906
Tallula melazonalis Hampson, 1906
Tancoa crinita (Schaus, 1912)
Tancoa calitas (Druce, 1899)
Tancoa sp.

Phycitinae
Anabasis ochrodesma (Zeller, 1881)
Caudellia declivella (Zeller, 1881)
Davara caricae (Dyar, 1913)
Difundella sp.
Dioryctria batesella Mutuura & Neunzig, 1986
Dioryctria erythropasa (Dyar, 1914)
Dioryctria sp.
Drescomopis soraella (Druce, 1899)
Ectomyelois muriscis (Dyar, 1914)
Eurythmidia ignidorsella (Ragonot, 1887)
Piesmopoda sp.
Tlascala reductella (Walker, 1863)
Ufa rubedinella (Zeller, 1848)

Thyridoidea

Thyrididae
Banisia furva epasta Whalley, 1976
Draconia rusina Druce, 1895
Draconia denticulata (Pagenstecher, 1892)
Dysodia sp. 1-2
Gippius sumptuosus Walker, 1855
Microsca sp.
Pseudendromis thetis (Druce, 1899)
Rhodoneura nebulosa (Warren, 1889)
Zeuzerodes fumatilis (Pagenstecher, 1892)
undetermined sp. 1-4

Mimallonoidea

Mimallonidae
Cicinnus sp.
Druentica partha (Schaus, 1905)
Roelmana maloba (Scahus, 1905)

Lasiocampoidea

Lasiocampidae
Artace cribraria (Ljungh, 1825)
Euglyphis amathuria Druce, 1890
Euglyphis amisena (Druce, 1890)
Euglyphis canifascia (Walker, 1869)
Euglyphis cercina (Druce, 1897)
Euglyphis guttularis (Walker, 1855)
Euglyphis poasia Schaus, 1910
Euglyphis thyatira (Druce, 1887)
Euglyphis zurcheri Druce, 1897
Euglyphis sp. 1-2
Eutachyptera psidii Sallé, 1857
Nesara casada (Schaus, 1911)
Nesara sp.
Prorifrons sp.
Tolype caieta Druce, 1897

Bombycoidea

Bombycidae
Apatelodes satellitia (Walker, 1855)
Apatelodes merlona Schaus, 1939
Colla coelestis Schaus, 1910
Epia muscosa (Butler, 1878)
Epia casnonia (Druce, 1887)
Olceclostera indentata Schaus, 1910
Olceclostera sp.

Saturniidae

Oxyteninae
Oxytenis beprea Druce, 1886
Oxytenis modestia (Cramer, [1780])

Arsenurinae
Arsenura armida (Cramer, 1779)
Arsenura batesii (Felder & Rogenhofer, 1874)
Caio championi (Druce, 1886)
Copiopteryx semiramis banghaasi Draudt 1930
Dysdaemonia boreas (Cramer, [1775])
Rhescyntis hippodamia (Cramer, 1777)
Titaea tamerlan nobilis (Schaus, 1912)
Titaea sp. nr tamerlan (Maasen, 1869)

Ceratocampinae
Adeloneivaia boisduvalii (Doûmet, 1859)
Adeloneivaia jason (Boisduval, 1872)
Adeloneivaia subangulata (Herrich-Schäffer, [1855])
Adelowalkeria caeca Lemaire, 1969
Citheronia bellavista Draudt, 1930
Citheronia lobesis Rothschild, 1907
Citheronoides collaris (Rothschild, 1907)
Citioica anthonilis (Herrich-Schäffer, [1854])
Eacles imperialis (Drury, 1773)
Eacles imperialis decoris Rothschild, 1907
Eacles masoni Schaus, 1896
Eacles ormondei Schaus, 1889
Othorene purpurascens (Schaus, 1905)
Othorene verana (Schaus, 1900)
Schausiella santarosensis Lemaire, 1982
Syssphinx colla Dyar, 1907
Syssphinx mexicana (Boisduval, 1872)
Syssphinx molina (Cramer 1780)
Syssphinx montana (Packard, 1905)
Syssphinx quadrilineata (Grote & Robinson, 1867)
Syssphinx sp.

Hemileucinae
Automeris banus (Boisduval, 1875)
Automeris belti Druce 1886
Automeris excreta Draudt, 1929
Automeris hamata Schaus, 1906
Automeris jucunda (Cramer, 1779)
Automeris lauta Johnson & Michener, 1948
Automeris metzli (Sallé, 1853)
Automeris moloneyi Druce, 1897
Automeris pallidior Draudt, 1929
Automeris phrynon Druce, 1897
Automeris postalbida Schaus, 1900
Automeris rubrescens (Walker, 1855)
Automeris tridens (Herrich-Schäffer, 1855)
Automeris zozine Druce, 1886
Dirphia avia (Stoll, 1780)
Dirphiopsis flora (Schaus, 1911)
Gamelia abas (Cramer, 1775)
Gamelia septentrionalis Bouvier, 1936
Hylesia continua (Walker, 1865)
Hylesia gamelioides Michener, 1952
Hylesia lineata Druce, 1886
Hylesia rosacea rosacea Schaus, 1911,
Hylesia rubrifrons Schaus, 1911
Hylesia tinturex Schaus, 1921
Hylesia umbratula Dyar, 1927
Hyperchira nausica (Cramer, 1779)
Leucanella acutissima Walker, 1865
Leucanella contempta Lemaire, 1967
Lonomia electra Druce 1886
Molippa nibasa (Maassen & Weyding, 1885)
Paradirphia boudinoti Lemaire & Wolfe, 1990
Paradirphia rectilineata Wolfe, 1994
Paradirphia semirosea (Walker 1855)
Periphoba arcaei E. D. Jones, 1908
Pseudodirphia menander (Druce, 1886)
Pseudodirphia regia (Draudt, 1930)

Saturniinae
Antheraea godmani (Druce 1892)
Copaxa escalantei Lemaire, 1971
Copaxa cydippe (Druce, 1894)
Copaxa evelynae Wolfe & Lemaire (1993)
Copaxa lavendera (Westwood, 1853)
Copaxa mazaorum Lemaire, 1982
Copaxa multifenestrata (Herrich-Schäffer, 1858)
Copaxa rufinans Schaus, 1906
Copaxa curvilinea Schaus, 1912
Copaxa sophronia Schaus, 1921
Eupackardia calleta (Westwood, 1853)
Rothschildia erycina mexicana Draudt, 1929
Rothschildia lebeau (Guérin-Méneville 1868)
Rothschildia orizaba (Westwood, 1853)
Rothschildia roxana Schaus, 1905

Sphingidae

Macroglossinae
Aellopos ceculus (Cramer, 1777)
Aellopos clavipes Rothschild & Jordan, 1903
Aellopos titan (Cramer, 1777)
Aleuron chloroptera (Perty, 1833)
Aleuron neglectum Rothschild & Jordan, 1903
Callionima denticulata (Schaus, 1895),
Callionima falcifera (Gehlen, 1943)
Callionima nomius (Walker, 1856),
Callionima pan (Cramer, 1779)
Callionima parce (Fabricius, 1775)
Cautethia spuria (Boisduval, 1875)
Cautethia yucatana Clark, 1919
Enyo gorgon (Cramer, 1777)
Enyo lugubris lugubris (Linnaeus, 1771)
Enyo ocypete (Linnaeus, 1758)
Enyo taedium Schaus, 1890 PBL
Erinnyis alope (Drury, 1773)
Erinnyis crameri (Schaus, 1898)
Erinnyis ello ello (Linnaeus, 1758)
Erinnyis lassauxii (Boisduval, 1859)
Erinnyis obscura (Fabricius, 1775)
Erinnyis oenotrus (Cramer, 1780)
Erinnyis yucatana (Druce, 1888)
Eumorpha achemon Drury, 1773
Eumorpha anchemolus (Cramer, 1779)
Eumorpha capronnieri (Boisduval, 1875)
Eumorpha fasciatus (Sulzer, 1776)
Eumorpha labruscae (Linnaeus, 1758)
Eumorpha obliquus obliquus (Rothschild & Jordan, 1903)
Eumorpha phorbas (Cramer, 1775)
Eumorpha satellitia licaon (Cramer, 1775)
Eumorpha triangulum (Rothschild & Jordan, 1903)
Eumorpha typhon (Klug, 1836)
Eumorpha vitis vitis (Linnaeus, 1748)
Hemeroplanes ornatus Rothschild, 1894
Hemeroplanes triptolemus (Cramer, 1779)
Hyles lineata lineata (Fabricius., 1775)
Isognathus rimosa (Grote, 1865)
Isognathus scyron (Cramer, 1780)
Madoryx oiclus (Cramer, 1779)
Madoryx plutonius (Hübner, 1819)
Nyceryx coffaeae (Walker, 1856)
Nyceryx eximia (Rothschild & Jordan, 1916)
Nyceryx riscus (Schaus, 1890)
Nyceryx tacita (Druce, 1888)
Pachylia darceta Druce, 1881
Pachylia ficus (Linnaeus, 1758)
Pachylia syces syces (Hübner, 1819)
Pachylioides resumens (Walker, 1856)
Perigonia jamaicensis Rothschild, 1894
Perigonia lusca (Fabricius, 1777)
Perigonia pallida Rothschild & Jordan, 1903,
Perigonia stulta Herrich-Schäffer, 1854
Phryxus caicus (Cramer, 1777)
Pseudosphinx tetrio (Linnaeus, 1771)
Stolidoptera tachasara (Druce, 1888)
Unzela japix japix (Cramer, 1776)
Xylophanes acrus Rothschild & Jordan, 1910
Xylophanes amadis cyrene (Druce, 1881)
Xylophanes anubus (Cramer, 1777)
Xylophanes belti (Druce, 1878)
Xylophanes ceratomioides Grote & Robinson, 1867
Xylophanes chiron nechus (Cramer, 1777)
Xylophanes cyrene (Druce, 1881)
Xylophanes damocrita (Druce, 1894)
Xylophanes eumedon (Boisduval, 1875)
Xylophanes falco (Walker, 1856)
Xylophanes germen germen (Schaus, 1890)
Xylophanes hannemanni Closs, 1917
Xylophanes juanita Rothschild & Jordan, 1903
Xylophanes libya (Druce, 1878)
Xylophanes loelia (Druce, 1878)
Xylophanes neoptolemus (Stoll, 1780)
Xylophanes pistacina Boisduval, 1875
Xylophanes pluto (Fabricius, 1777)
Xylophanes porcus continentalis Rothschild & Jordan, 1903
Xylophanes pyrrhus (Rothschild & Jordan, 1906)
Xylophanes tersa (Linnaeus, 1771)
Xylophanes thyelia (Linnaeus, 1758)
Xylophanes titana (Druce, 1878)
Xylophanes turbata (H. Edwards, 1887)
Xylophanes tyndarus tyndarus (Boisduval, 1875)
Xylophanes undata Rothschild & Jordan, 1903
Xylophanes zurcheri (Druce, 1894)

Smerinthinae
Adhemarius dariensis (Rothschild & Jordan, 1903)
Adhemarius donysa (Druce, 1889)
Adhemarius gannascus gannascus (Stoll, 1790)
Adhemarius ypsilon (Rothschild & Jordan, 1903)
Protambulyx strigilis (Linnaeus, 1771)

Sphinginae
Agrius cingulata (Fabricius, 1775)
Amphimoea walkeri (Boisduval, 1875)
Cocytius antaeus (Drury, 1773)
Cocytius duponchel (Poey, 1832)
Cocytius lucifer Rothschild & Jordan, 1903
Manduca albiplaga (Walker, 1856)
Manduca corallina (Druce, 1883)
Manduca extrema (Gehlen, 1926)
Manduca florestan (Stoll, 1782)
Manduca incisa (Walker, 1856)
Manduca lanuginosa (H. Edwards, 1887)
Manduca lefeburii (Guèrin-Mèneville, 1844)
Manduca muscosa (Rothschild & Jordan, 1903)
Manduca occulta (Rothschild & Jordan, 1903)
Manduca ochus (Klug, 1836)
Manduca pellenia (Herrich-Schäffer, 1854)
Manduca rustica rustica (Fabricius, 1775)
Manduca sexta (Linnaeus, 1763)
Manduca wellingi Brou, 1984
Neococytius cluentius (Cramer, 1775)
Sphinx leucophaeata Clemens, 1859
Sphinx merops (Linnaeus, 1758)
Sphinx praelongus (Rothschild & Jordan, 1903)

Hedyloidea

Hedylidae
Macrosoma bahiata (Felder & Rogenhofer, 1875)
Macrosoma cascaria (Schaus, 1901)
Macrosoma conifera (Warren, 1897)
Macrosoma hyacinthina (Warren, 1905)
Macrosoma lucivittata (Walker,1863)
Macrosoma rubedinaria (Walker, 1862)
Macrosoma semiermis (Prout, 1932)

Geometroidea

Sematuridae
Coronidia canace (Hopffer, 1856)
Mania lunus (Linnaeus, 1758)

Uraniidae

Uraniinae
Urania fulgens (Walker, 1854)

Epipleminae
Aniplecta sp.
Epiplema sp.
Philagraula slossoniae Hulst, 1896

Geometridae

Oenochrominae
Ametris nitocris (Cramer, 1780)
Ergavia carinenta (Cramer, 1777)
Ergavia merops (Cramer, 1775)
Macrotes commatica Prout, 1916

Geometrinae
Chlorochlamys sp.
Chloropteryx dealbata (Warren, 1909)
Chloropteryx diluta (Dognin, 1911)
Chloropteryx opalaria (Guenée, 1858)
Chloropteryx sp.
Dichorda consequaria (H. Edwards, 1884)
Lissochlora magnostigma (Dyar, 1912)
Neagathia corruptata (Felder & Rogenhofer, 1875)
Nemoria aturia (Druce, 1892)
Nemoria punctilinea (Dognin, 1902)
Nemoria scriptaria (Hübner, 1823)
Nemoria venezuelae (Prout, 1932)
Nemoria nr. karlae Pitkin, 1993
Nemoria nr. parcipunta (Dognin, 1908)
Nemoria nr. priscillae Pitkin, 1993
Oospila concinna Warren, 1900
Oospila rosipara Warren, 1897
Oospila venezuelata (Walker, 1861)
Phrudocentra janeira (Schaus, 1897)
Phrudocentra pupillata Warren, 1897
Pyrochlora rhanis (Cramer, 1777)
Rhodochlora brunneipalpis Warren, 1894
Synchlora expulsata (Walker, 1861)
Synchlora gerularia (Hübner, [1823])
Synchlora pulchrifimbria Warren, 1907
Synchlora venustula (Dognin, 1910)
Tachyphyle sp. nr. acuta Butler, 1881
Xerochlora sp. nr. masonaria (Schaus, 1897)

Sterrhiinae
Cyclophora anablemma (Prout, 1938)
Dithecodes distracta (Walker, 1861)
Dithecodes sp.
Haemalea imitans (Dognin, 1900)
Idaea complexaria (Schaus, 1901)
Idaea contractalis (Walker, 1866)
Idaea helleria (Schaus, 1913)
Idaea latiferaria Walker, 1861
Idaea spernata (Walker, 1861)
Idaea subfervens (Prout, 1920)
Idaea tacturata (Walker, 1861)
Idaea sp.
Idaea sp. nr. elegentaria (Herrich-Schäffer, 1854)
Idaea sp. nr. pervertipennis (Hulst, 1900)
Leptostales crossii (Hulst, 1900)
Leptostales sp.
Lobocleta figurinata (Guenée, 1858)
Pleuroprucha sp. nr. ochrea (Warren, 1897)
Scopula apparitaria (Walker, 1861)
Scopula confertaria (Walker, 1861)
Scopula privata (Walker, 1861)
Scopula subquadrata (Guenée, 1858)
Scopula suffundaria (Walker, 1861)
Scopula umbilicata (Fabricius, 1794)
Scopula sp.
Semaeopus caecaria (Hübner, 1825)
Semaeopus deflexa (Warren, 1900)
Semaeopus varia (Warren, 1895)
Semaeopus sp.
Smicropus intercepta (Walker, 1854)
Smicropus laeta (Walker, [1865])
Tricentra quadrigata (Felder, 1875)
Tricentra sp. 1-2
Tricentra sp. nr. fulvifera Dognin, 1908
Tricentrogyna violescens (Schaus, 1901)x
Tricentrogyna sp. 1-2
Tricentrogyna sp. nr. deportata (Walker, 1861)
Trygodes musivaria (Herrich-Schäffer, 1855)

Larentiinae
Disclisioprocta stellata (Guenée, 1858)
Eois catana Druce, 1892
Eois expressaria (Walker, 1861)
Eois heliadaria (Guenée, 1858)
Eois insignata (Walker, 1861)
Eois sp. 1-4
Eois sp. nr. binaria (Guenée [1858])
Eois sp. nr. dorisaria (Schaus, 1913)
Eubaphe conformis (Walker, 1854)
Eubaphe sp.
Eudulophasia invaria (Walker, 1854)
Euphyia cinerascens (Dognin, 1900)
Euphyia sp.
Eupithecia spilosata (Walker, 1863)
Eupithecia sp. 1-2
Eutrepsia dispar (Walker, 1854)
Obila floccosaria (Walker, 1866)
Obila pannosata (Guenée, 1858)
Obila sp.
Oligopluera aulaeata Felder & Rogenhofer, 1875
Oligopluera malachitaria Herrich-Schäffer, 1855
Psaliodes sp.
Rheumaptera sp.

Ennominae
Cimicodes albicosta Dognin, 1913
Cyclomia disparlis Schaus, 1911
Cyclomia minuta (Druce, 1892)
Dyschoroneura obsolescens Warren, 1894
Epimecis detexta (Walker, 1860)
Epimecis fraternaria (Guenée, 1858)
Epimecis matronaria (Guenée, 1858)
Epimecis patronaria (Walker, 1860)
Epimecis subroraria Walker, 1860
Epimecis sp.
Erastria decrepitaria (Hübner, 1823)
Euclysia dentifasciata Dognin, 1910
Euclysia sp.
Eusarca asteria (Druce, 1892)
Eusarca minucia (Druce, 1892)
Eusarca nemoria (Druce, 1892)
Glena agria Rindge, 1967
Herbita lilacina (Warren, 1897)
Hymenomima camerata Warren, 1900
Hymenomima sp. 1-2
Iridopsis herse (Schaus, 1912)
Iridopsis oberthuri Prout, 1932
Iridopsis pandarosos (Schaus, 1912)
Iridopsis validaria (Guenée, 1858)
Iridopsis nr. aviceps Prout, 1932
Leuciris fimbriaria (Stoll, [1781])
Leucula abilinearia Guenée, 1858
Macaria aequiferaria Walker, 1861
Macaria gambarina (Stoll, [1781])
Macaria regulata (Fabricius, 1775)
Macaria subfulva (Warren, 1906)
Macaria sp. 1-3
Macaria sp. nr. ferina (Dognin, 1924)
Macaria sp. nr. guapilaris (Schaus, 1911)
Macaria sp. nr. lydia (Scahus, 1912)
Melanchroia chephise (Stoll, 1782)
Melanolophia flexilinea (Warren, 1906)
Melanolophia sadrina (Schaus, 1901)
Melanolophia sp.
Microgonia rufaria Warren, 1901
Nematocampa completa Warren, 1904
Nematocampa sp.
Nepheloleuca floridata (Grote, 1883)
Nepheloleuca politia (Cramer, 1777)
Opisthoxia bella (Butler, 1881)
Opisthoxia uncinata (Schaus, 1912)
Opisthoxia sp. nr. cluana (Druce, 1900)
Oxydia apidania (Cramer, 1779)
Oxydia vesulia (Cramer, 1779)
Pantherodes pardalaria Hübner, 1823
Pantherodes sp.
Paragonia cruraria (Herrich- Schäffer, 1854)
Parilexia cermala (Druce, 1893)
Patalene aenetusaria (Walker, 1860)
Patalene hamulata (Guenée, 1858)
Patalene luciata (Stoll, 1790)
Patalene trogonaria (Herrich-Schäffer, 1856)
Patalene nr. asychisaria (Walker, 1860)
Patalene sp.
Periclina syctaria (Walker, 1860)
Perigramma repitita Warren, 1905
Perigramma sp. nr. guatemalaria Schaus, 1927
Pero afuera Poole, 1987
Pero astapa (Druce, 1892)
Pero aurunca (Druce, 1892)
Pero clysiaria (Felder & Rogenhofer, 1875)
Pero coronata Warren, 1904
Pero delauta (Warren, 1907)
Pero dularia Poole, 1987
Pero fragila Poole, 1987
Pero fusaria (Walker, 1860)
Pero incisa Dognin, 1889
Pero lessema (Schaus, 1901)
Pero melissa (Druce, 1892)
Pero polygonaria (Herrich-Schäffer, 1855)
Pero probata Poole, 1987
Pero pumaria Felder & Rogenhofer, 1875
Pero saturata (Walker, 1868)
Pero spina Poole, 1897
Pero verda Poole, 1987
Pero sp. nr. anceta (Stoll, 1781)
Phrygionis divitaria (Oberthür, 1916)
Phrygionis pallicosta (Felder & Rogenhofer, 1875)
Phrygionis polita (Cramer, 1780)
Phrygionis privignaria (Guenée [1858])
Phyle schausaria (H. Edwards, 1884)
Physocleora sp.
Pityeja histrionaria (Herrich-Schäffer, 1853)
Polla celeraria (Walker, 1860)
Prochoerodes striata (Stoll, 1798)
Prochoerodes sp.
Psamatodes abydata (Guenée, [1858])
Pyrinia itunaria Walker, 1860
Pyrinia sanitaria Schaus 1901
Pyrinia sp.
Semiothisa carinaria Dognin, 1924
Semiothisa divergentata (Snellen, 1894)
Sericoptera mahometaria (Herrich-Schäffer, 1856)
Simena luctifera (Walker, 1856)
Sphacelodes vulneraria (Hübner, 1823)
Synnomos firmamentaria Guenée, 1858
Thysanopyga amarantha Debauche, 1937
Thysanopyga apitruncaria Herrich-Schäffer, 1856
Thysanopyga carfinia (Druce, 1893)
Thysanopyga pygaria (Guenée, 1858)
Tornos pusillus Rindge, 1954
Trotopera arrhapa (Druce, 1891)

Noctuoidea

Notodontidae

Notodontinae
Cerura rarata Walker, 1865

Dudusinae
Crinodes besckei (Hübner, 1824)
Crinodes guatemalena Druce, 1887
Crinodes schausi Rothschild, 1917
Crinodes striolata Schaus, 1901

Hemiceratinae
Apela neobule Druce, 1905
Hemiceras alba Walker, 1865
Hemiceras bilinea Schaus
Hemiceras spp. 1–16

Heterocampinae
Antaea omana Schaus, 1906
Chilara cresus (Cramer, 1777)
Colax phocus Schaus, 1892
Colax sp.
Contrebia extrema Walker, 1856
Disphragis livida Schaus, 1911
Disphragis remuria Druce, 1898
Disphragis tharis (Stoll, [1780])
Drugera morona Druce, 1898
Farigia sp. nr. magniplaga Schaus, 1906
Farigia sp.
Hapigia annulata Schaus, 1905
Hapigia repandens Schaus, 1906
Hapigia simplex (Walker, 1865)
Hapigia sp. 1-2
Magava multilinea Walker, 1865
Naprepa sp.
Rhuda difficilis Schaus, 1911
Rhuda tuisa Schaus, 1911
Rifargia gelduba Schaus, 1892
Rifargia sp. 1-3
Rosema apicalis Walker, 1855
Rosema epigena (Stoll, 1790)
Rosema thestia Druce, 1898
Sericochroa arecosa Druce, 1898
Trichomaplata sp.

Nystaleinae
Bardaxima meyeri Schaus, 1928
Calledema argenta Schaus, 1905
Calledema jocasta (Schaus, 1901)
Didugua argentilinea Druce, 1891
Didugua violascens Herrich-Schäffer
Elasmia astuta Schaus, 1894
Lepasta bractea (Felder, 1874)
Lepasta grammodes Felder, 1874
Marthula cynrica Schaus, 1928
Notoplusia marchiana Schaus, 1928
Nystalea clotho Thiaucourt, 2002
Nystalea malga Schaus, 1904
Nystalea superciliosa Guenée, 1852
Nystalea unguicularis Thiaucourt, 2002
Pentobesa maya Thiaucourt, 2008
Pentobesa xylinoides (Walker, 1866)
Strophocerus albonotatus Druce, 1909
Symmerista meridionalis Thaiucourt, 2007

Dioptinae
Brachyglene crocearia (Schaus), 1912
Dioptis butes (Druce, 1885)
Dioptis eteocles (Druce, 1885)
Ephialtias pseudena (Boisduval, 1870)
Getta turrenti Miller, 2009
Isostyla ithomeina (Butler, 1872)
Josia enoides (Boisduval, 1870)
Josia frigida Druce, 1885
Josia fusigera Walker, 1864
Josia hyperia (Walker, 1854)
Josia integra Walker, 1854
Josia megaera (Fabricius, 1787)
Josia sp.
Lirimiris guatemalensis Rothschild, 1917
Lirimiris lignitecta Walker, 1865
Lirimiris meridionalis Schaus, 1904
Lyces ariaca (Druce, 1885)
Lyces tamara (Hering, 1925)
Notodontidae (incertae sedis)
Oricia truncata Walker, 1854
Pentobesa lignicolor Möschler, 1877
Phaeochlaena gyon (Fabricius, 1787)
Phaeochlaena tendinosa Hübner, 1818
Phanoptis cyanomelas C. Felder & R. Felder, 1874
Scotura annulata (Guérin-Méneville), 1844

Erebidae

Lymantriinae
Caviria sp.
Eloria subnuda Walker, 1855
Terphothrix tibialis (Walker, 1855)

Arctiinae

Lithosiini
Agylla pogonoda Hampson, 1900
Agylla spp. 1–4
Apistosia judas Hübner, [1819]
Ardonea morio Walker, 1854
Areva trigemmis (Hübner, 1827)
Balbura fasciata Schaus, 1911
Balbura intervenata Schaus, 1911
Balbura sp. nr. dorsisigna Walker, 1854
Cisthene polyzona Druce, 1885
Diarhabdosia laudamia (Druce, 1885)
Epeiromulona roseata Field, 1952
Eudesmia laetifera Walker, 1864
Eudesmia menea (Drury, 1782)
Eurylomia cordula (Boisduval, 1870)
Euthyone grisescens (Schaus 1911)
Euthyone simplex (Walker, 1854)
Euthyone theodula (Schaus, 1924)
Lycomorphodes sordida (Butler, 1877)
Lycomorphodes sp.
Metalobosia sp. nr. ducalis Schaus, 1911
Mulona phelina (Druce, 1885)
Talara synnephela Dyar, 1916
Tuina cingulata (Walker, 1854)

Arctiini

=Arctiina=
Arachnis aulaea Geyer, 1837
Arachnis dilecta (Boisduval, 1870)
Estigmene acrea (Drury, 1773)
Hypercompe caudata (Walker, 1855)
Hypercompe leucarctiodes (Grote & Robinson, 1967)
Hypercompe perplexa Schaus, 1911
Notarctia proxima (Guérin- Méneville, 1844)
Virbia birchi (Druce, 1911)
Virbia sp.

=Callimorphina=
Utetheisa ornatrix (Linnaeus, 1758)

=Pericopina=
Calodesma maculifrons (Walker, 1865)
Chetone angulosa (Walker, 1854)
Chetone histrio Boisduval, 1870
Chetone ithomia (Boisduval, 1870)
Composia fidelissima Herrich-Schäffer, 1866
Dysschema aorsa (Boisduval, 1870)
Dysschema cerealis (Druce, 1884)
Dysschema leucophaea (Walker, 1854)
Dysschema lycaste (Klug, 1836)
Dysschema magdala (Boisduval, 1870)
Dysschema mariamne (Geyer, 1836)
Dysschema sp.
Heliactinidia sitia Schaus, 1910
Hyalurga sora (Boisduval, 1870)
Hyalurga urioides Schaus, 1910
Hypocrita albimaculata (Druce, 1897)
Hypocrita ambigua (Hering, 1925)
Hypocrita arcaei (Druce, 1884)
Hypocrita excellens (Walker, 1854)
Hypocrita pylotis (Drury, 1773)
Xenosoma flaviceps (Walker, 1865)

=Phaegopterina=
Amaxia apyga Hampson, 1901
Amaxia beata (Dognin, 1909)
Amaxia pardalis Walker, 1855
Amaxia sp.
Anaxita decorata Walker, 1855
Anaxita drucei Rodriguez 1893
Belemnia inaurata Sulzer, 1776
Castrica phalaenoides (Drury, 1773)
Cissura plumbea Hampson, 1901
Cratoplastis diluta Felder, 1874
Elysius conspersus Walker, 1855
Euchaetes antica (Walker, 1856)
Evius hippia (Stoll, [1790])
Gorgonidia buckleyi Druce, 1883
Halysidota excellens Walker
Halysidota grandis (Rothschild, 1909)
Halysidota pectenella Watson, 1980
Idalus alteria Schaus, 1905
Idalus crinis Druce, 1884
Idalus dares Druce, 1894
Idalus herois Schaus, 1889
Idalus vitrea (Cramer, 1780)
Lophocampa alternata (Grote, 1867)
Lophocampa annulata Walker
Lophocampa catenulata (Hübner, [1812])
Lophocampa citrina (Sepp, [1843])
Lophocampa seruba (Herrich-Schäffer, [1855])
Melese amastris (Druce, 1884)
Melese asana (Druce, 1884)
Melese flavimaculata Dognin, 1899
Munona iridescens Schaus, 1894
Neritos samos Druce, 1896
Ormetica ataenia (Schaus, 1910)
Ormetica goloma (Schaus, 1920)
Ormetica guapisa (Schaus, 1910)
Ormetica orbona (Schaus, 1889)
Ormetica sicilia Druce, 1884
Ormetica taeniata (Guérin-Méneville, [1844])
Parathyris cedonulli (Stoll, 1781)
Pareuchaetes insulata (Walker, 1855)
Parevia gurma Schaus, 1920
Pelochyta misera Schaus, 1911
Phaeomolis lineatus Druce, 1884
Pseudohemihyalea fallaciosa (Toulgoët, 1997)
Pseudohemihyalea labeculoides Toulgoët, 1995
Pseudohemihyalea porioni Toulgoët, 1995
Rhipha chionoplaga (Dognin, 1913)
Rhipha persimilis (Rothschild, 1909)
Robinsonia deiopea Druce, 1895
Robinsonia sabata Druce, 1895
Selenarctia elissa (Schaus, 1892)
Symphlebia lophocampoides Felder, 1874
Symphlebia underwoodi (Rothschild, 1910)
Trichromia atta (Schaus, 1920)
Trichromia flavoroseus (Walker, 1855)
Trichromia sp.
Trichromia sp. nr. cotes (Druce, 1896)
Viviennea tegyra (Druce, 1896)

=Euchromiina=
Chrysocale principalis (Walker, [1865])
Cosmosoma achemon (Fabricius, 1781)
Cosmosoma braconoides (Walker, 1854)
Cosmosoma cingulatum Butler, 1876
Cosmosoma festiva Walker, 1854
Cosmosoma hercyna (Druce, 1884)
Cosmosoma intensa (Walker, 1854)
Cosmosoma ruatana (Druce, 1888)
Cosmosoma sectinota Hampson, 1898
Cosmosoma stibosticta (Butler, 1876)
Cosmosoma sp. nr. teuthras (Walker, 1854)
Dycladia basimacula Schaus, 1924
Dycladia vitrina Rothschild, 1911
Eunomia colombina (Fabricius, 1793)
Eunomia latenigra (Butler, 1876)
Gymnelia sp. nr. nobilis Schaus, 1911
Homoeocera gigantea (Druce, 1884)
Horama oedippus (Boisduval, 1870)
Horama panthalon (Fabricius, 1793)
Horama plumipes (Drury, 1773)
Loxophlebia geminata Schaus, 1905
Loxophlebia masa (Druce, 1889)
Macrocneme adonis Druce, 1884
Macrocneme auripes (Walker, 1854)
Macrocneme cabimensis Dyar, 1914
Macrocneme chrysitis (Guérin-Méneville, 1844)
Macrocneme iole Druce, 1884
Macrocneme lades (Cramer, [1776])
Mesothen pyrrha (Schaus, 1889)
Myrmecopsis strigosa (Druce, 1884)
Pheia albisigna (Walker, 1854)
Phoenicoprocta sp. sanguinea (Walker, 1854)
Poliopastea sp.
Pseudomya melanthoides Schaus, 1920
Psoloptera basifulva Schaus, 1894
Saurita fumosa (Schaus, 1912)
Saurita myrrha Druce, 1884
Saurita temenus (Stoll, [1781])
Saurita tipulina (Hübner, 1827)
Sphecosoma felderi (Druce, 1883)
Syntomeida melanthus (Cramer, [1779])
Xanthyda xanthosticta (Hampson, 1898)

=Ctenuchina=
Aclytia albistriga Schaus, 1910
Aclytia heber (Cramer, 1780)
Aclytia punctata Butler, 1876
Aclytia reducta Rothschild, 1912
Aclytia sp.
Agyrta dux Walker, 1854
Antichloris caca Hübner, 1818
Antichloris viridis Druce, 1884
Chlorostola interrupta Walker
Chrysostola augusta (Druce, 1884)
Chrysostola moza (Druce, 1896)
Correbidia costinotata Schaus, 1911
Correbidia elegans (Druce, 1884)
Correbidia germana Rothschild, 1912
Correbidia undulata (Druce, 1884)
Ctenucha ruficeps Walker, 1854
Ctenucha venosa Walker, 1854
Cyanopepla arrogans (Walker, 1854)
Cyanopepla jalifa (Boisduval, 1870)
Delphyre hebes Walker, 1854
Delphyre testacea (Druce, 1884)
Desmotricha perplexa (Rothschild, 1912)
Dinia aeagrus (Cramer, [1779])
Ecdemus obscurata Schaus, 1911
Episcepsis inornata (Walker, 1856)
Episcepsis lenaeus Cramer, 1870
Episcepsis thetis Linnaeus 1771
Episcepsis venata Butler, 1877
Eriphioides tractipennis (Butler, 1876)
Eucereon aroa Schaus, 1894
Eucereon atriguttum Druce, 1905
Eucereon aurantiaca (Rothschild, 1909)
Eucereon balium Hampson, 1898
Eucereon latifascia Walker, 1856
Eucereon maja Druce, 1884
Eucereon obscurum Möschler, 1872
Eucereon pilatii Walker, 1854
Eucereon pseudarchias Hampson, 1898
Eucereon rosa (Walker, 1854)
Eucereon rosadora Dyar, 1910
Eucereon varium (Walker, 1854)
Heliura rhodophila (Walker, 1856)
Heliura tetragramma (Walker, 1854)
Hyaleucerea gigantea (Druce, 1884)
Hyaleucerea vulnerata Butler, 1875
Mydromera notochloris (Boisduval, 1870)
Napata leucotelus Butler, 1876
Napata walkeri (Druce, 1889)
Neacerea rufiventris Schaus, 1894
Ptychotrichos episcepsidis Dyar, 1914
Trichura coarctata (Drury, 1773)
Trichura druryi Hübner, [1819]
Trichura esmeralda (Walker, 1854)

Herminiinae
Bleptina hydrillalis Guenée, 1854
Macrochilo andaca (Druce, 1891)
Lascoria sp.
Macrochilo sp.
Palthis orasiusalis Walker, 1859
Palthis sp. nr. bizialis (Walker, 1859)

Hypeninae
Cecharismena darconis (Schaus, 1913)
Hypena perialis Schaus, 1904
Hypena porrectalis Fabricius, 1794
Hypena subidalis Guenée, 1854
Hypena sp.
Isogona natatrix Guenée, 1852
Phytometra flacillalis (Walker, 1859)
Radara aquilalis Schaus, 1916
Radara nealcesalis (Walker, 1859)
Radara nezeila (Schaus, 1906)
Radara zoum (Dyar, 1914)
Radara sp.
Trauaxa obliqualis Walker, 1866

Anobinae
Anoba pohli (Felder & Rogenhofer, 1874)
Baniana ostia Druce, 1898
Baniana suggesta (Walker, 1858)
Baniana ypita Schaus, 1901

Erebinae

Thermesiini
Ascalapha odorata (Linnaeus, 1758)
Hemeroblemma acron (Cramer, 1779)
Hemeroblemma dolosa Hübner, [1823]
Hemeroblemma mexicana (Guenée, 1852)
Hemeroblemma opigena (Drury, 1773)
Hemeroblemma sp.
Letis buteo Guenée, 1852
Letis herilia (Stoll, 1780)
Letis mycerina (Cramer, 1777)
Thermesia sobria Walker, 1865
Thysania agrippina (Cramer, 1776)

Catocalini
Argidia sp. nr. hypoxantha (Hampson, 1926)
Hemicephalis agenoria (Druce, 1890)
Hypogrammodes balma Guenée, 1852
Ramphia albizona (Latreille, 1817)

Metipotini
Melipotis descreta (Walker, [1858])
Melipotis famelica (Guenée, 1852)
Melipotis fasciolaris (Hübner, 1825)
Melipotis nigrobasis (Guenée, 1852)
Melipotis perpendicularis (Guenée, 1852)
Melipotis sp.
Orodesma schausi (Druce, 1890)

Euclidiini
Celiptera sp.
Mocis diffluens (Guenée, 1852)
Mocis disseverans Walker, 1858
Mocis dyndima (Stoll, 1782)
Mocis latipes (Guenée, 1852)
Mocis marcida (Guenée, 1852)
Mocis texana (Morrison, 1875)
Ptichodis bistrigata Hübner, 1818

Poaphilini
Dysgonia expediens (Walker, 1858)
Dysgonia purpurata Kaye, 1901

Ophiusini
Achaea lienardi Boisduval, 1833
Amolita sp. 1-2
Coenipeta bibitrix (Hübner, 1823)
Coenipeta damonia (Stoll, 1782)
Coenipeta hemiplagia Felder & Rogenhofer, 1874
Coenipeta phasis Cramer, 1977
Coenipeta tanais (Cramer,1776)
Coenipeta sp. nr. medalba Schaus 1906
Epidromia pannosa Guenée, 1852
Epidromia tinctifera (Walker, 1858)
Euclystis insana (Guenée, 1852)
Euclystis plusiodes (Walker, 1858)
Helia argentipes (Walker, 1869)
Helia celita (Schaus, 1912)
Homoptera brevipennis Walker, 1869
Itomia lignaris Hübner, 1823
Itomia multilinea Walker, 1858
Itomia opistographa Guenée, 1852
Kakopoda progenies (Guenée, 1852)
Lesmone formularis (Geyer, 1837)
Metria aperta (Walker, [1858])
Metria endopolia (Dyar, 1917)
Metria simplicior (Walker, [1858])
Metria spp. 1–4
Ophisma minna Guenée, 1852
Ophisma tropicalis Guenée, 1852
Selenisa sueroides (Guenée, 1852)
Toxonprucha diffundens Walker, 1858

Unplaced Erebinae
Calyptis semicuprea (Walker, 1857)
Catephiodes trinidadensis (Kaye, 1901)
Coenobela paucula (Walker, 1858)
Nymbis iniqua Guenée, 1852
Perasia helvina (Guenée, 1852)
Ptichodes basilans (Guenée, 1852)

Eulepidotinae

Eulepidotini
Eulepidotis addens (Walker, 1858)
Eulepidotis alabastraria Hübner, 1823
Eulepidotis electa Dyar, 1914
Eulepidotis carcistola Hampson, 1926
Eulepidotis hermura Schaus, 1898
Eulepidotis inclyta Fabricius, 1997
Eulepidotis juncida Guenée, 1852
Eulepidotis modestula (Herrich-Schäffer, 1869)
Eulepidotis perducens (Walker, 1858)
Eulepidotis punctilinea Schaus, 1921
Eulepidotis testaceiceps Felder, 1874
Eulepidotis suppura Dyar, 1914
Eulepidotis sp.
Obrima pyraloides Walker, 1865

Panopodini
Antiblemma amarga (Schaus, 1911)
Antiblemma hamilcar (Schaus, 1914)
Antiblemma imitans (Walker, 1858)
Antiblemma incarnans Felder & Rogenhofer, 1874
Antiblemma memoranda Schaus, 1911
Antiblemma neptis (Cramer, 1779)
Antiblemma rufinans Guenée, 1852
Antiblemma sterope (Stoll, 1780)
Antiblemma sufficiens (Walker, 1858)
Antiblemma sp.
Anticarsia anisospila (Walker, 1869)
Anticarsia gemmatalis Hübner, 1818
Athyrma adjutrix auth. not (Cramer, 1780)
Azeta ceramina Hübner, [1821]
Azeta rhodogaster Guenée, 1852
Azeta signans Walker
Epitausa atriplaga (Walker, 1858)
Eulepidotinae (incertae sedis)
Litoprosopus confligens (Walker, [1858])

Euteliidae

Euteliinae
Eutelia auratrix Walker, 1858
Eutelia sp.
Paectes abrostoloides Guenée, 1852
Paectes albescens Hampson, 1912
Paectes fovifera Hampson, 1912
Paectes fuscescens (Walker, 1855)
Paectes glauca (Hampson, 1905)
Paectes lunodes Guenée, 1852

Nolidae
Iscadia argentea (Walker, 1869)
Iscadia furcifera (Walker, 1869)
Meganola leucostola (Hampson, 1900)
Neostictoptera nigropuncta Druce, 1900
Nola turbana Schaus, 1921

Noctuidae

Plusiinae

Argyrogrammatini
Argyrogramma verruca (Fabricius, 1794)
Chrysodeixis includens (Walker, [1858])
Trichoplusia ni (Hübner, [1803])

Plusiini
Autoplusia egena (Guenée, 1852)

Bagisarinae
Amyna octo Guenée, 1852
Bagisara patula (Druce, 1898)
Bagisara repanda (Fabricius, 1793)

Cydosiinae
Cydosia curvinella Guenée, 1879
Cydosia phaedra Druce, 1897

Eustrotiinae
Marimatha botyoides (Guenée, 1852)
Marimatha sp.
Tripudia furcula Pogue, 2009

Acontiinae
Acidaliodes celenna Druce, 1892
Acontia tetragona Walker, [1858]

Diphtherinae
Diphthera festiva (Fabricius, 1775)

Acronictinae
Antachara rotundata Walker, 1858
Argyrosticta ditissima (Walker, [1858])
Argyrosticta vauaurea (Hampson, 1908)

Amphipyrinae
Cropia connecta (Smith, 1894)
Cropia philia (Druce, 1889)
Metaponpneumata rogenhoferi Möschler, 1890

Oncocnemidinae
Neogalea sunia (Guenée, 1852)

Agaristinae
Darceta falcata (Druce, 1883)
Darceta proserpina (Stoll, [1782])
Epithisanotia sanctijohannis Stephens, 1850
Seirocastnia amalthea (Dalman, 1823)
Vespola caerulifera (Walker, 1867)

Condicinae

Condicini
Condica cupienta (Cramer, 1780)
Condica imitata (Druce, 1891)
Condica mimica (Hampson, 1908)
Condica mobilis Walker, [1857]
Condica subaurea (Guenée, 1852)
Condica subornata (Walker, 1865)
Condica sutor (Guenée, 1852)
Condica sp. 1-2

Leuconyctini
Diastema tigris Guenée, 1852
Micrathetis dasarada (Druce, 1898)
Micrathetis triplex (Walker, 1857)

Heliothinae
Helicoverpa zea (Boddie, 1850)
Heliothis virescens (Fabricius, 1777)

Eriopinae
Callopistria floridensis (Guenée, 1852)
Callopistria rivularis (Walker, [1858])

Noctuinae

Phosphilini
Spodoptera albula (Walker, 1857)
Spodoptera dolichos (Fabricius, 1794)
Spodoptera eridania (Cramer, 1784)
Spodoptera exigua (Hübner, [1808])
Spodoptera frugiperda (J.E. Smith, 1797)
Spodoptera latifascia (Walker, 1856)
Spodoptera ornithogalli (Guenée, 1852)
Spodoptera spp.

Elaphriini
Elaphria agrotina (Guenée, 1852)
Elaphria deltoides (Möschler, 1880)
Elaphria sp. nr. perigeana (Schaus, 1911)
Elaphria sp. 1-2
Gonodes liquida (Möschler, 1886)

Dypterygiini
Neophaenis respondens (Walker, 1858)

Xylenini
Xylina subcostalis Walker, 1869

Hadenini
Stauropides persimilis Hampson, 1909

Leucaniini
Leucania inconspicua Herrich-Schäffer, 1868
Leucania multilinea Walker, 1856
Mythimna unipuncta (Haworth, 1809)

Noctuini
Agrotis ipsilon (Hufnagel, 1766)
Agrotis subterranea (Fabricius, 1794)
Anicla infecta (Ochsenheimer, 1816)

Stictopterinae
Nagara vitrea (Guenée, 1852)

References
Miller et al. "An annotated list of the Lepidoptera of Honduras" Insecta Mundi 0205, February 2012

Lepidoptera
Lepidoptera

Honduras